= List of Antioch College people =

This page lists notable alumni and former students, faculty, and administrators of Antioch College.

== Alumni ==
=== Art, architecture, and engineering ===
- Emma Amos (B.A. 1968), postmodernist African-American painter and printmaker
- Kathan Brown (B.A. 1958), printmaker, writer, lecturer, entrepreneur and founder of Crown Point Press
- Peter Calthorpe (B.A. 1972), architect, urban designer, urban planner, and author; founding member of the Congress for the New Urbanism
- Jewell James Ebers (1946), electrical engineer
- Wendy Ewald (B.A. 1974), photographer, professor at Duke University
- Carole Harmel (B.A. 1969), photographer, artist, educator, co-founder of Artemisia Gallery women's cooperative in Chicago (1973)
- Peter Jacobs (B.A. 1961), landscape architect, emeritus professor of Landscape Architecture, Université de Montréal, awarded Order of Canada
- Brian Shure (B.A. 1974), has taught in the printmaking department at Rhode Island School of Design since 1996
- Leilah Weinraub (2003), filmmaker, conceptual artist

=== Activists ===
- John Bachtell (1978), chairman of the Communist Party USA 2014–2019
- Olympia Brown (1860), suffragist, women's rights activist, minister
- Mariana Wright Chapman (ca. 1857), social reformer, suffragist
- Lucy Salisbury Doolittle (circa 1852), philanthropist
- Leo Drey (1939), conservationist
- Philip Isely (1937), peace activist, writer and founder of WCPA and GREN/EFM
- Jeff Mackler (1963), national secretary of Socialist Action
- José Ramos-Horta (1984), co-recipient of the Nobel Peace Prize in 2007, East Timor independence activist, head of the United Nations Integrated Peacebuilding Office in Guinea-Bissau, former prime minister and president of East Timor
- Marty Rosenbluth (1999), immigration attorney and civil rights activist
- Coretta Scott King (1951), human rights activist and wife of Martin Luther King Jr.
- Frances Cress Welsing (1957), psychiatrist and author of The Isis Papers

=== Business ===
- Warren Bennis (1951), distinguished Professor of Business Administration at the University of Southern California; chair of the advisory board of the Harvard University Kennedy School's Center for Public Leadership; author of more than 30 books on leadership
- Margaret Isely, businesswomen, founder of the health food chain Natural Grocers
- Theodore Levitt (1949), economist, Harvard Professor
- Jay W. Lorsch (1955), Louis Kirstein Professor of Human Relations at the Harvard Business School

=== Education ===
- Edythe Scott Bagley (1947), professor of Theater and Performing Arts, Cheyney University of Pennsylvania
- Harry M. Cleaver (B.A. 1967 economics), Marxist theoretician, and professor emeritus at the University of Texas at Austin
- Drucilla Cornell (1978), philosopher, feminist theorist, and legal theorist
- Shelton H. Davis (1965), public-interest anthropologist
- Lisa Delpit (1974), author of Other People's Children; director of the Center for Urban Educational Excellence
- Frances Degen Horowitz (B.A. 1954), educator and psychologist, president emerita of City University of New York Graduate School and University Center
- Deborah Meier (1954), educator, considered the founder of the modern small schools movement
- Tom Mooney (B.A. 1975), labor leader and teacher
- Brian Shure (B.A. 1974), has taught in the printmaking department at Rhode Island School of Design since 1996
- James A.F. Stoner (B.S. 1959 engineering), holder of James A.F. Stoner Chair in Global Quality Leadership at Fordham University, author
- Joan Straumanis (B.A. 1957 mathematics, political science), first female president of Antioch College, her alma mater; philosopher and women's studies pioneer at Denison University; dean at Kenyon College, Rollins College, Lehigh University, president also at Metropolitan College of New York

=== Entertainment ===
- Idris Ackamoor (1973), musician, founder of jazz collective The Pyramids
- Peter Adair (1967), filmmaker
- Peggy Ahwesh (1978), filmmaker and video artist
- Ray Benson (1974), front man of Asleep at the Wheel, actor and voice actor
- Nick DeMartino, former senior vice president, Media and Technology for the American Film Institute
- Nathaniel Dorsky (1943), video artist and author
- Suzanne Fiol, founder of ISSUE Project Room
- John Flansburgh (1983), singer/songwriter, They Might Be Giants
- Herb Gardner (1958), playwright
- Miles Goodman (1972), film composer and record producer
- Theo Hakola (1977), singer/songwriter/musician and novelist
- John Hammond Jr., blues guitarist/vocalist
- Victoria Hochberg (1964), film/television writer/director
- Ken Jenkins (1963), actor on Scrubs
- Nick Katzman, blues musician
- Jorma Kaukonen (1962), guitarist/vocalist, Jefferson Airplane, Hot Tuna
- James Klein (BA 1968), documentary filmmaker, director, producer, two-time Academy Award nominee
- John Korty (1959), TV and screenwriter, Emmy for The Autobiography of Miss Jane Pittman, Oscar for documentary of Japanese internment camps
- Peter Kurland, Academy Award-nominated sound mixer
- Arthur Lithgow (1938), actor, director, pioneer of regional theater
- Alan Lloyd, composer closely associated with the works of Robert Wilson
- Leonard Nimoy (MA 1977), actor, film director, poet, musician and photographer; played the role of Mr. Spock in the original Star Trek TV series
- Julia Reichert (BA 1970), documentary filmmaker, director, producer, Academy Award Winner- Documentary film
- Linda Reisman (BA 1980), film producer
- Cliff Robertson (1946), Academy Award-winning actor
- Rod Serling (1950), creator of The Twilight Zone TV series
- Louise Smith (BA 1977), playwright and actress; Obie Award recipient
- Jay Tuck (1968), television producer for ARD German television, author
- David Wilcox, folk musician and singer-songwriter
- Mia Zapata (1989), lead singer of The Gits

=== Government ===
- Chester G. Atkins (1970), former United States representative
- Joseph H. Ball (1929), journalist, politician and businessman, United States senator
- Bill Bradbury (1960), Oregon secretary of state
- Lynn J. Bush (1948), senior judge for the United States Court of Federal Claims
- LaDoris Cordell (BA 1971), retired judge of the Superior Court of California
- John de Jongh (1981), United States Virgin Islands governor
- LaShann Moutique DeArcy Hall (1992), district judge for the United States District Court for the Eastern District of New York
- Hattie N. Harrison, member of the Maryland House of Delegates
- Joanne Head, member of the New Hampshire House of Representatives
- A. Leon Higginbotham Jr. (1949), civil rights advocate; author; judge of the United States Court of Appeals for the Third Circuit (1977–1993), and of the United States District Court for the Eastern District of Pennsylvania (1964–1977); chief judge of the Third Circuit from 1990 to 1991; received the Presidential Medal of Freedom in 1995
- J. Warren Keifer, prominent U.S. politician during the 1880s, 30th speaker of the U.S. House of Representatives
- Gail D. Mathieu (1973), B.A., current United States Ambassador to Namibia and former United States Ambassador to Niger
- Eleanor Holmes Norton (1960), Congressional delegate, representing the District of Columbia; chair, U.S. Equal Employment Opportunity Commission, 1977–1981 (first female chair of USEEOC); professor of Law, Georgetown University Law Center (1982–2019)
- Americus V. Rice, Civil War general, U.S. representative
- E. Denise Simmons, mayor of Cambridge, Massachusetts; first openly lesbian African-American mayor of an American city
- Richard Socarides (BA 1976), political strategist, commentator
- Webster Street, Arizona territorial judge

=== Literature and journalism ===
- Lawrence Block (1960), author
- Peg Bracken (1940), humorist
- Eliza Archard Conner (1838–1912), journalist, lecturer, and feminist
- James Galvin (1974), poet and author
- Michael Goldfarb (1972), author and journalist
- Jaimy Gordon (1966), author of Lord of Misrule, winner of the National Book Award
- Karl Grossman (1964), journalist and author
- Virginia Hamilton (1957), children's books author and MacArthur Fellow
- Peter Irons (1966), legal historian and author
- Laurence Leamer (1964), author and journalist
- Franz Lidz (1973), journalist and author whose memoir, Unstrung Heroes, became a 1995 feature film directed by Diane Keaton
- Sylvia Nasar (1970), author, A Beautiful Mind
- Cary Nelson (1967), higher education activist, author
- Gregory Orr, poet and author
- Tito Perdue, novelist, attended Antioch (1956–57) but was sent down before graduation for cohabiting with a fellow student who was not yet his wife
- Marc Anthony Richardson (1995), novelist and artist, American Book Award winner for Year of the Rat
- John Robbins (1976), author of Diet for a New America; pioneer environmentalist; veganism advocate
- Bianca Stone (2006), poet and visual artist
- Mark Strand (1957), poet
- Nova Ren Suma (1997), author of young adult novels
- Ed Ward, journalist, writer, historian of rock
- Terri Windling (1979), influential mythic fiction and speculative fiction editor, author and artist

=== MacArthur Fellows ===
- Timothy Barrett (B.A. 1973), papermaker, researcher, and paper historian
- Lisa Delpit (B.A. 1974), education reform leader
- Wendy Ewald (B.A. 1974), photographer
- Stephen Jay Gould (B.S. 1963), paleontologist; professor at Harvard University
- Virginia Hamilton (attended 1952–55), writer
- Sylvia A. Law (B.A. 1964), human rights lawyer
- Deborah Meier (attended 1949–1951), education reform leader
- Mark Strand (B.A. 1957), poet and writer

=== Science and medicine ===
- Barbara Almond (B.S. 1959), psychiatrist and psychoanalyst
- Joseph Young Bergen (1872), botanist
- Mario Capecchi (B.S. 1961), PhD Harvard University, co-recipient of the Nobel Prize in Physiology or Medicine in 2007
- Don Clark (1953), clinical psychologist, author
- Leland C. Clark Jr. (B.S. 1941), PhD, biochemist and inventor
- George W. Comstock (1937), physician, public health expert, lead researcher in seminal studies demonstrating the effectiveness of isoniazid for treating latent tuberculosis infection
- William A. Gamson (1946), sociologist, president of American Sociological Association
- Clifford Geertz (1950), PhD. Harvard, Professor of Social Science, Univ. of Chicago and Princeton Univ.
- Stephen Jay Gould (1963), Harvard professor, geologist, evolutionary biologist, author
- Robin Kanarek (B.A. 1968), physiological psychologist and academic administrator
- Robert Manry (1949), nautical explorer
- Richard Pillard (1955), professor of psychiatry at Boston University; first openly gay psychiatrist in the U.S.
- Allan Pred (1957), geographer
- Sonya Rose (1958), sociologist and historian
- Joan Steitz (1963), molecular biologist and Sterling Professor at Yale University; 2018 Lasker Award recipient, Harvard PhD
- Judith G. Voet (B.S. 1963), professor of chemistry and biochemistry at Swarthmore College; author of several widely used biochemistry textbooks, PhD, University of Pennsylvania

=== Technology ===
- Brian Aker (B.S. 1994), open-source hacker

== Faculty ==
- Irwin Abrams, professor of history, pioneer in the field of peace research
- Tony Conrad, video artist, experimental filmmaker, musician, composer, sound artist, teacher, and writer
- Louis C. Fraina, professor of economics, founding member of the Communisty Party in the United States
- G. Stanley Hall, professor of English and philosophy; first president of the American Psychological Association and Clark University
- Horace Mann, founding president of Antioch College and "father of American education"
- Arthur Ernest Morgan, president of Antioch and chairman of Tennessee Valley Authority
- Edward Orton, Sr., first president of the Ohio State University
- Mary Tyler Peabody Mann, author and educator
- Cecil Taylor, pianist and poet, pioneer of free jazz
- Hendrik Willem van Loon, historian, geographer, journalist, author
