= World peace =

Ideal of freedom, peace, and happiness among and within all nations and people

A nuclear disarmament symbol, commonly called the "peace symbol"

World peace is the concept of an ideal vision statement of peace within and among all people and nations on Earth. Different cultures, religions, philosophies, and organizations have varying concepts on how such a state would come about.

Various religions and secular organizations have the stated aim of achieving world peace through addressing human rights, technology, education, engineering, and medicine, or diplomacy used as an end to all forms of fighting. Since 1945, the United Nations and the five permanent members of its Security Council (China, France, Russia, the United Kingdom, and the United States) have operated under the aim to resolve conflicts without war. Nonetheless, nations have entered numerous military conflicts since then.

== Theories ==
Many theories as to how world peace could be achieved have been proposed. Several of these are listed below.

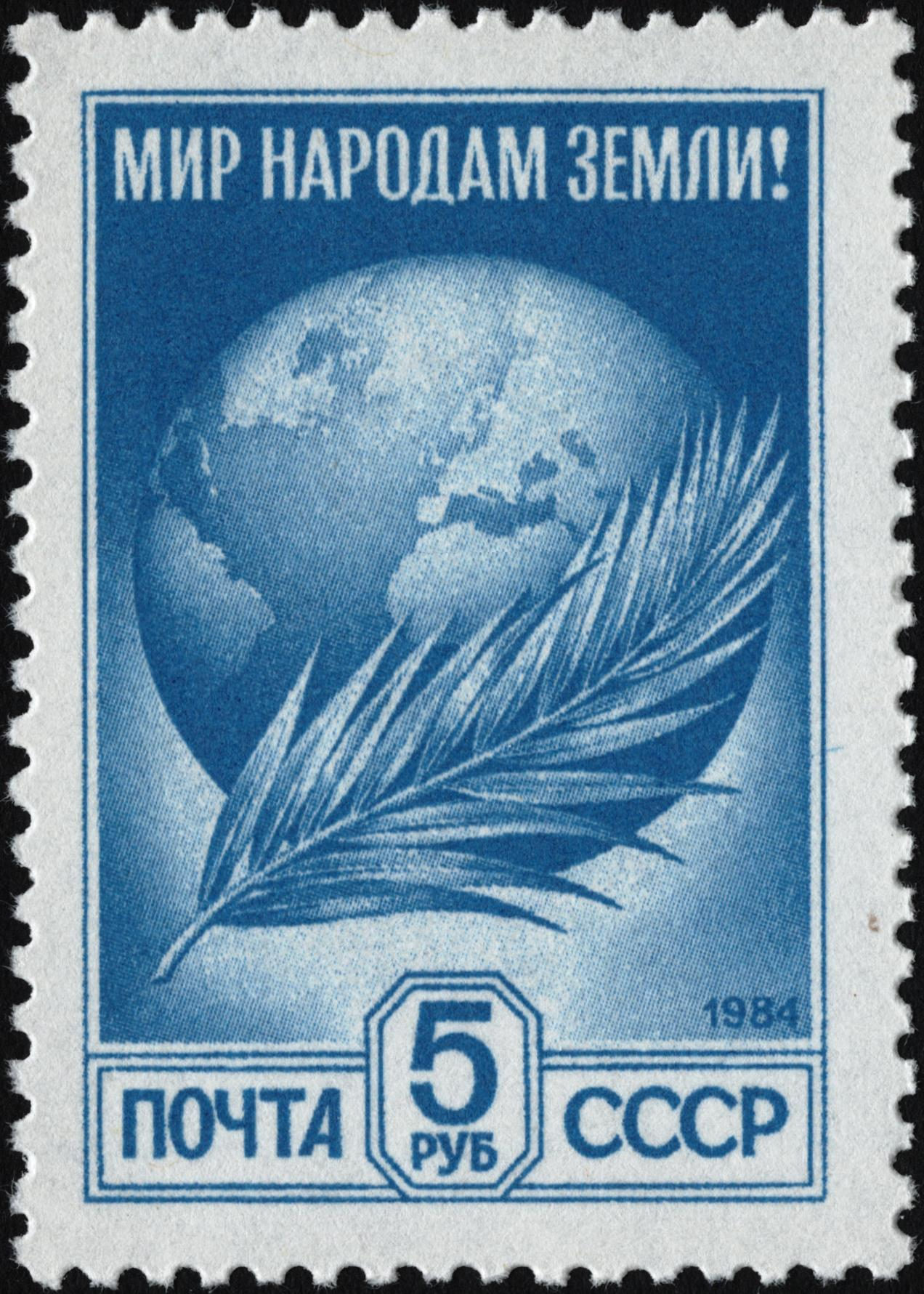
A 1984 USSR stamp illustrating the Earth behind a palm frond. The title reads: "Мир Народам Земли!" ("Peace to all the Peoples of the World!").

=== Capitalism peace theory ===
Capitalist, or commercial peace, forms one of the three planks of Kantian peace, together with democratic peace theory and institutionalist arguments for peace. Although the evidence is inconclusive, various scholars have argued for capitalist peace. For instance, in her essay "The Roots of War", Ayn Rand held that the major wars of history were started by the more controlled economies of the time against the freer ones and that capitalism gave humanity the longest period of peace in history—a period during which there were no wars involving the entire civilized world—from the end of the Napoleonic wars in 1815 to the outbreak of World War I in 1914, with the exceptions of the Franco-Prussian War (1870), the Spanish–American War (1898), the Crimean War (1853–1856), the Boer Wars (1880–1881, 1899–1902), and the American Civil War (1861–1865).

=== Cobdenism ===
Proponents of Cobdenism claim that by removing tariffs and creating international free trade, wars would become impossible because free trade prevents a nation from becoming self-sufficient, which is a requirement for long wars.

However, free trade does not prevent a nation from establishing some sort of emergency plan to become temporarily self-sufficient in case of war or that a nation could simply acquire what it needs from a different nation. A good example of this is World War I, during which both Britain and Germany became partially self-sufficient.

=== Democratic peace theory ===
Proponents of democratic peace theory, developed mainly in the 1960s but relying in part on eighteenth century Kantian theory, and frequently espoused by Western politicians, claim that strong empirical evidence exists that democracies never or rarely wage war against each other. However, several wars between democracies have taken place, historically, such as the Kargil War and the Cenepa War.

=== Economic norms theory ===
Michael Mousseau's economic norms theory links economic conditions with institutions of governance and conflict, distinguishing personal clientelist economies from impersonal market-oriented ones, identifying the latter with permanent peace within and between nations.

Throughout most of human history, societies have been based on personal relations: individuals in groups know each other and exchange favours. Today in most lower-income societies hierarchies of groups distribute wealth based on personal relationships among group leaders, a process often linked with clientelism and corruption. Michael Mousseau argues that in this kind of socio-economy conflict is always present, latent or overt, because individuals depend on their groups for physical and economic security and are thus loyal to their groups rather than their states, and because groups are in a constant state of conflict over access to state coffers. Through processes of bounded rationality, people are conditioned towards strong in-group identities and are easily swayed to fear outsiders, psychological predispositions that make possible sectarian violence, genocide, and terrorism.

Market-oriented socio-economics are integrated not with personal ties but the impersonal force of the market where most individuals are economically dependent on trusting strangers in contracts enforced by the state. This creates loyalty to a state that enforces the rule of law and contracts impartially and reliably and provides equal protection in the freedom to contract – that is, liberal democracy. Wars cannot happen within or between nations with market-integrated economies because war requires the harming of others, and in these kinds of economies, everyone is always economically better off when others in the market are also better off, not worse off. Rather than fight, citizens in market-oriented socio-economies care deeply about everyone's rights and welfare, so they demand economic growth at home and economic cooperation and human rights abroad. Nations with market-oriented socio-economies tend to agree on global issues and not a single fatality has occurred in any dispute between them.

Economic norms theory should not be confused with classical liberal theory. The latter assumes that markets are natural and that freer markets promote wealth. In contrast, Economic norms theory shows how market-contracting is a learned norm, and state spending, regulation, and redistribution are necessary to ensure that almost everyone can participate in the "social market" economy, which is in everyone's interests.

=== Marxism: World peace via world revolution ===
According to the dialectical materialist theory of Karl Marx, humanity under capitalism is divided into just two classes: the proletariat—who do not possess the means of production, and the bourgeoisie—who do possess the means of production. Once the communist revolution occurs and consequently abolishes the private propriety of the means of production, humanity will not be divided and the tension created between these two classes will cease.

=== Deterrence ===
Mutual assured destruction (MAD) is a doctrine of military strategy based on rational deterrence in which a full-scale use of nuclear weapons by two opposing sides would effectively result in the destruction of both belligerents. Proponents of the policy of MAD, which as a term was coined in 1962 during the Cold War, attributed this to the increase in the lethality of war to the point where it no longer offers the possibility of a net gain for either side (a form of Nash equilibrium), thereby making wars pointless.

=== Peace through strength ===
The concept of Peace through strength is traced back to the Roman Emperor Hadrian (reigned CE 117–138), or the Indian epic Ramayana (7th to 4th centuries BCE) Lord Rama is quoted as saying "Bhay Bin Hoye na Preet", meaning once prayers for peace fail, one may need to instill fear to bring peace. In 1943, at the peak of World War II, the founder of the Paneuropean Union, Richard von Coudenhove-Kalergi, argued that after the war the United States (U.S.) was bound to take "command of the skies" to ensure the lasting world peace:

But the inauguration of such a glorious century of peace demands from us abandonment of old conceptions of peace. The new Angel of Peace must no longer be pictured as a charming but helpless lady with an olive branch in her hand, but like the Goddess of Justice with a balance in her left and a sword in her right; or like the Archangel Michael, with a fiery sword and wings of steel, fighting the devil to restore and protect the peace of heaven.

In fact, near the entrance to the headquarters of the U.S. Strategic Air Command at Offutt Air Force Base stands a large sign with a SAC emblem and its motto: "Peace is our profession." The motto "was a staggering paradox that was also completely accurate". One SAC Bomber—Convair B-36—is called Peacemaker and one inter-continental missile-LGM-118-Peacekeeper.

In 2016, former U.S. Secretary of Defense Ash Carter envisaged that the re-balance to the Asia-Pacific will make the region "peaceful" through "strength":

You, and your fellow soldiers, sailors, airmen, and Marines will solidify the rebalance, you will make this network work, and you will help the Asia-Pacific... realize a principled and peaceful and prosperous future. And play the role only America can play... You'll do so with strength.

Introduction to US National Security and Defense Strategies of 2018 states: The US force posture combined with the allies will "preserve peace through strength". The document proceeds to detail what "achieving peace through strength requires".

=== Territorial peace theory ===
Proponents of the territorial peace theory claim that countries with stable borders are likely to develop democracy, while wars and territorial threats foster authoritarian attitudes and a disregard for democracy. Increasing attention has been paid to the theory since the early 2000s, and it has increasingly informed democratic peace theory and been espoused in the cause of peacebuilding and international relations. Proponents of democratic peace theory counter argue that stable borders resulting from dispute arbitration or negotiation rather than force via autocracy are more likely to be obtained by democratic states. Efforts are underway to synthesize the two theories.

== Efforts ==
=== United Nations Charter and international law ===
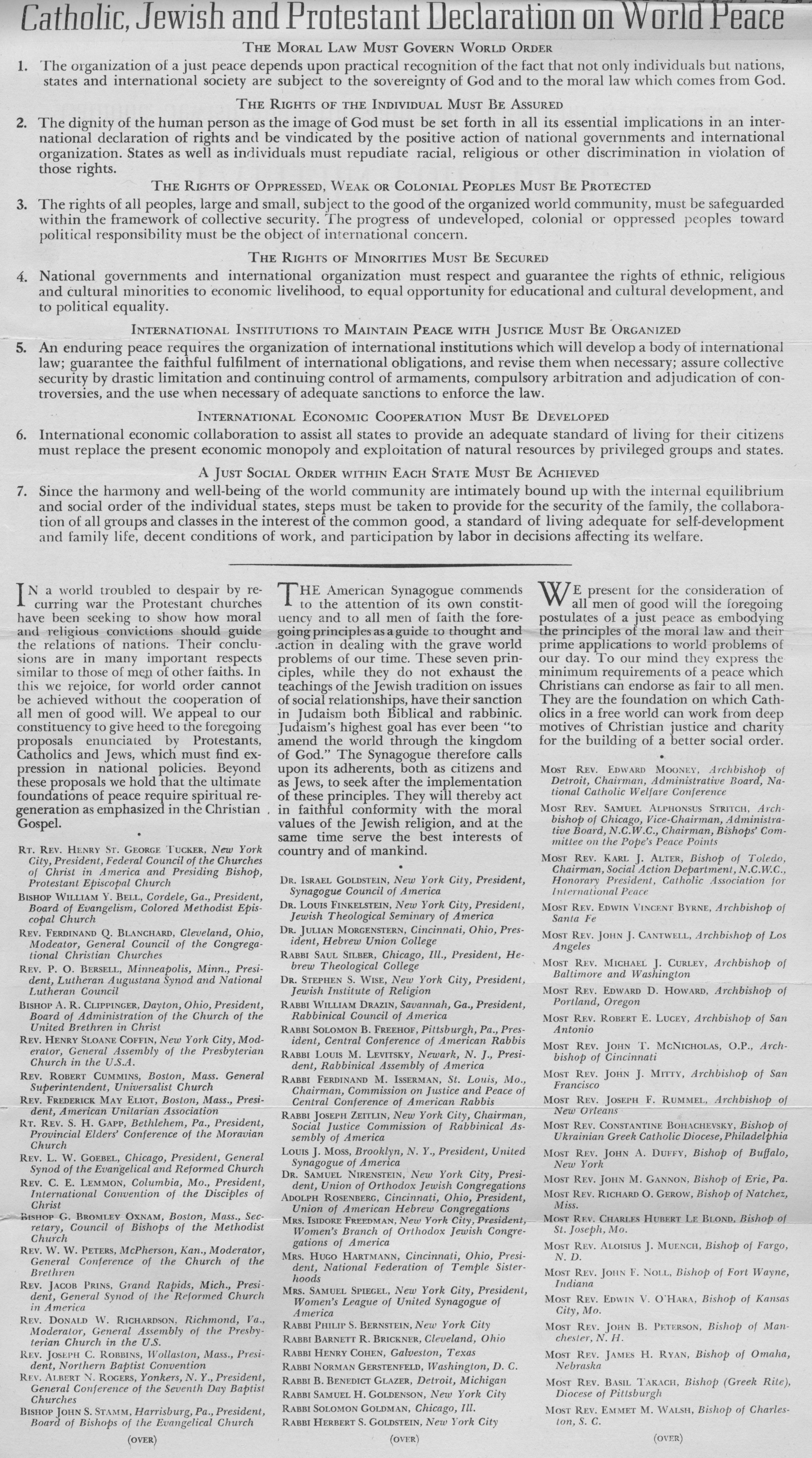
Interfaith declaration on world peace from the 1941–43 bulletin for the Commission to Study the Organization of Peace

After World War II, the United Nations was established by the United Nations Charter to "save successive generations from the scourge of war which twice in our lifetime has brought untold sorrow to mankind" (Preamble). The Preamble to the UN Charter also aims to further the adoption of fundamental human rights, to respect obligations to sources of international law as well as to unite the strength of independent countries to maintain international peace and security. All treaties on international human rights law refer to or consider "the principles proclaimed in the Charter of the United Nations, recognition of the inherent dignity and the equal and inalienable rights of all members of the human family is the foundation of freedom, justice and "peace in the world".

==== Security Council ====
The UN body with primary authority for maintaining international peace and security is the UN Security Council. Under Article VII of the UN Charter, the Security Council may enact binding resolutions whenever it determines there is a threat to peace, a breach of the peace, or an act of aggression. Moreover, the Security Council has the power to authorize the use of force in response to a breach of the peace. The Security Council can also impose economic sanctions in response to a breach of the peace.

==== International Day of Peace ====
The UN International Day of Peace, sometimes called World Peace Day, is observed annually on 21 September. It is dedicated to peace, and specifically the absence of war and violence, and can be celebrated by a temporary ceasefire in a combat zone. The International Day of Peace was established in 1981 by the UN General Assembly. Two decades later, in 2001, the General Assembly unanimously voted to designate the day as a day of preventing violence and a cease-fire. The celebration of this day is recognized by many nations and people. In 2013, for the first time, the day has been dedicated to peace education, i.e. by the key preventive means to reduce war sustainably.

=== Constitution for the Federation of Earth ===
Considering the UN's design as a forum and its lack of direct power or authority over nations, it has received a fair amount of criticism and since its foundation, prominent world figures have expressed their concerns and called for the establishment of a democratic federal world government. It is in that response, in early 1960s, the most comprehensive effort was made to draft a world constitution. Thane Read and Philip Isely drafted a form of agreement that aimed to admit delegates from both national governments and the people of all countries for a world constitutional convention. A worldwide call for a World Constitutional Convention was sent, and thousands of world figures and five national governments signed the call. In result of that, the World Constitutional Convention and the Peoples World Parliament were held in Interlaken, Switzerland, and Wolfach, Germany, in 1968. Over 200 participants from 27 countries attended these sessions, where the drafting of a constitution for a global federal world government began. The second session of the World Constituent Assembly took place in Innsbruck, Austria, in 1977. And after extensive discussions and amendments, the draft constitution was unanimously adopted as the Constitution for the Federation of Earth. It was further amended in the 3rd Constituent Assembly, Colombo, Sri Lanka, 1978-79 and the 4th World Constituent Assembly, Troia, Portugal, in 1991.

This constitution outlines a detailed plan for a world federalist government and awaits ratification by the people and nations of the world. It includes the protection of universal human rights, prevention of war, secure disarmament, social development, protection of the environment, and addresses many more global challenges.

A Provisional World Parliament (PWP), a transitional international legislative body, operates under the framework of the Constitution for the Federation of Earth. It convenes to work on global issues, gathering delegates from different countries.

== Religious views ==
Many religions and religious leaders have expressed a desire for an end to violence.

=== Baháʼí Faith ===
The central aim of the Baháʼí Faith is the establishment of the unity of the peoples of the world. Bahá'u'lláh, the founder of the Baháʼí Faith, stated in no uncertain terms, "the fundamental purpose animating the Faith of God and His Religion is to safeguard the interests and promote the unity of the human race ...". In his writings, Bahá'u'lláh described two distinct stages of world peace – a lesser peace and a sense of most great peace.

The lesser peace is essentially a collective security agreement between the nations of the world. In this arrangement, nations agree to protect one another by rising up against an aggressor nation, should it seek the usurpation of territory or the destruction of its neighbors. The lesser peace is limited in scope and is concerned with the establishment of basic order and the universal recognition of national borders and the sovereignty of nations. Baháʼís believe that the lesser peace is taking place largely through the operation of the Divine Will and that Baháʼí influence on the process is relatively minor.

The greatest peace is the eventual end goal of the lesser peace and is envisioned as a time of spiritual and social unity – a time when the peoples of the world genuinely identify with and care for one another, rather than simply tolerating one other's existence. The Baháʼís view this process as taking place largely as a result of the spread of Baháʼí teachings, principles, and practices throughout the world. The larger world peace process and its foundational elements are addressed in the document The Promise of World Peace, written by the Universal House of Justice.

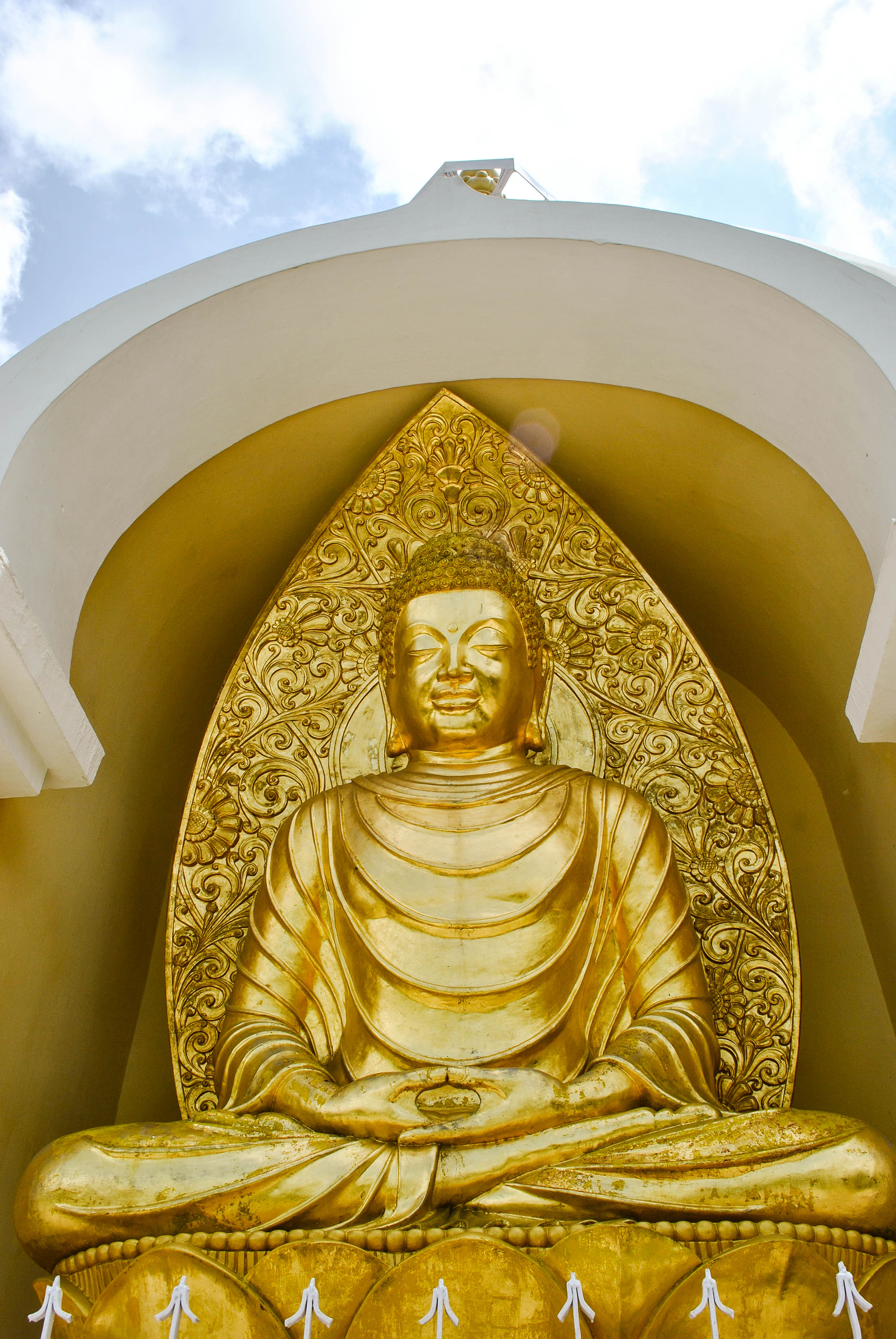
Statue of Buddha in the Darjeeling Peace Pagoda, India. This pagoda was designed by Japanese Buddhist monk Nichidatsu Fujii to unite people of all beliefs in their search for world peace.

=== Buddhism ===
Many Buddhists believe that world peace can only be achieved if individuals establish peace within their minds first. The Buddha's teachings emphasize that anger and other negative states of mind are the cause of wars and conflict. Buddhists believe people can live in peace and harmony only if they abandon negative emotions such as anger and cultivate positive emotions such as loving-kindness and compassion. As with all Dharmic religions (Hinduism, Jainism, Buddhism, and Sikhism), ahimsa (avoidance of violence) is a central concept.

Hatred is never appeased by hatred in this world. By non-hatred alone is hatred appeased. This is a law eternal.

— Siddhārtha Gautama, The Dhammapada: Pairs Verse 5

Peace pagodas are monuments that are built to symbolize and inspire world peace and have been central to the peace movement throughout the years. These are typical of Buddhist origin, being built by the Japanese Buddhist organization Nipponzan Myohoji. They exist around the world in cities such as London, Vienna, New Delhi, Tokyo, and Lumbini.

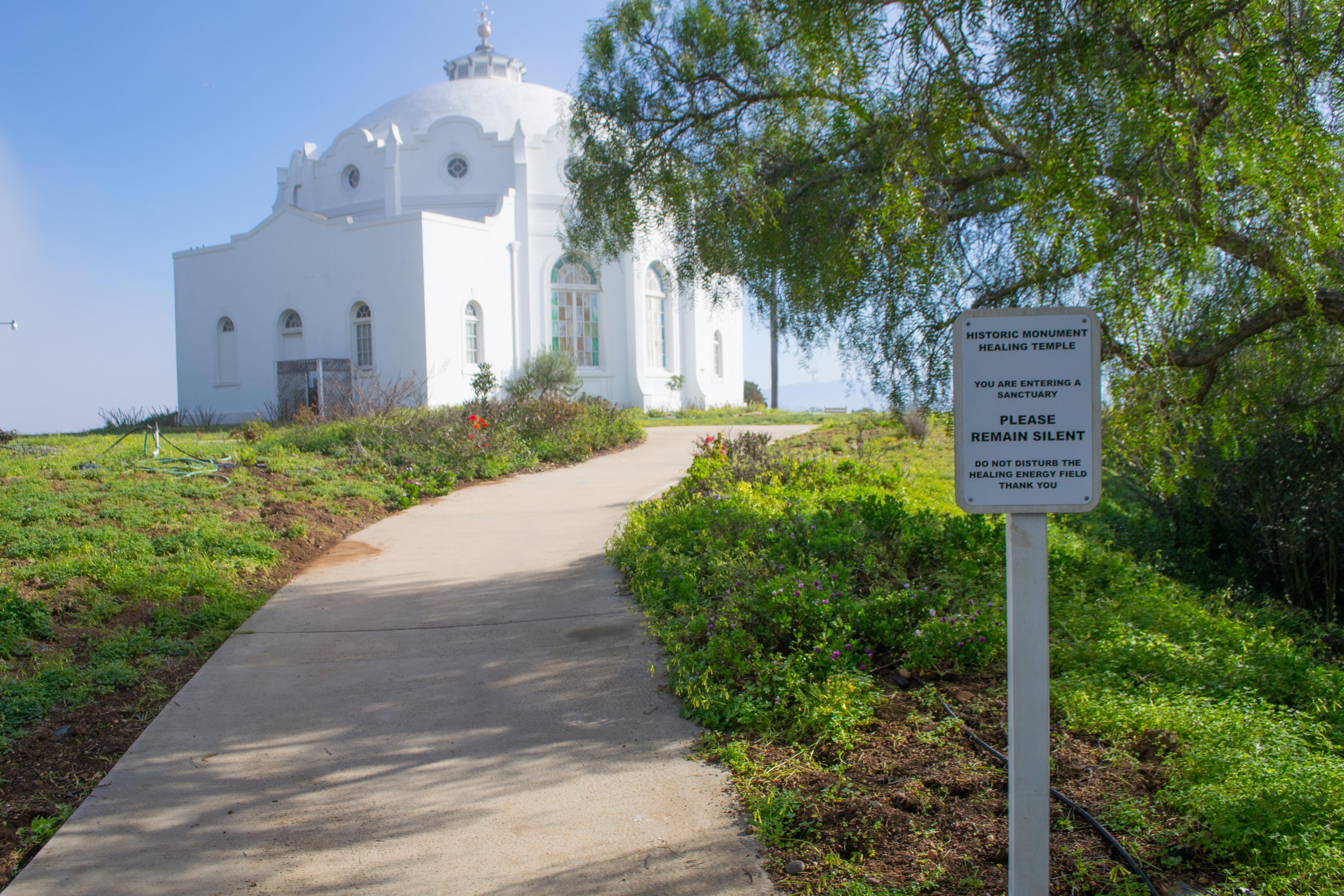
Mount Ecclesia's long-standing suggestion for World Peace Meditation, along with annual purposeful devotional dates, as faithfully performed by its fraternal organization whose founder taught, in the 1910s, that "Peace is a matter of education, and impossible of achievement until we have learned to deal charitably, justly, and openly with one another, as nations as well as individuals"

=== Christianity ===
The basic Christian ideal specifies that peace can only come by the Word and love of God, which is perfectly demonstrated in the life of Christ:

Peace I leave with you; my peace I give you. I do not give to you as the world gives. Do not let your hearts be troubled and do not be afraid.

— John 14:27

As christologically interpreted from Isaiah 2, whereupon the "Word of the Lord" is established on the earth, the material human-political result will be 'nation not taking up sword against nation; nor will they train for war anymore'. Christian world peace necessitates the living of a proactive life replete with all good works indirect light of the Word of God. The details of such a life can be observed in the Gospels, especially the historically renowned Sermon on the Mount, where forgiving those who do wrong things against oneself is advocated among other pious precepts.

However, not all Christians expect a lasting world peace on this earth:

Do not suppose that I have come to bring peace to the earth. I did not come to bring peace, but a sword. For I have come to turn a man against his father, a daughter against her mother, a daughter-in-law against her mother-in-law—a man's enemies will be the members of his own household.

— Matt 10:34–36

Many Christians believe that world peace is expected to be manifest upon the "new earth" that is promised in Christian scripture such as Revelation 21.

The Roman Catholic religious conception of "Consecration of Russia", related to the Church's high-priority Fátima Marian apparitions, promises a temporary world peace as a result of this process being fulfilled, though before the coming of the Antichrist. This period of temporary peace is called the triumph of the Immaculate Heart.

Pacifist religious groups that are related to Christianity include Quakers, the Amish, and Mennonites. These groups are known for advocating religious nonviolence, and their adherents are often conscientious objectors.

=== Hinduism ===
Traditionally, Hinduism has adopted an ancient Sanskrit phrase Vasudhaiva kutumbakam, which translates as "The world is one family". The essence of this concept is the observation that only base minds see dichotomies and divisions. The more we seek wisdom, the more we become inclusive and free our internal spirit from worldly illusions or Maya. World peace is hence only achieved through internal means—by liberating ourselves from artificial boundaries that separate us all.

Sanskrit: ॐ द्यौः शान्तिरन्तरिक्षं शान्तिः पृथिवी शान्तिरापः शान्तिरोषधयः शान्तिः । वनस्पतयः शान्तिर्विश्वे देवाः शान्तिर्ब्रह्म शान्तिः सर्वं शान्तिः शान्तिरेव शान्तिः सा मा शान्तिरेधि ॥ ॐ शान्तिः शान्तिः शान्तिः ॥, romanized: Dyauh santirantariksam santih prthivi santircipah santirosadhayah santih. Vanaspatayah santirvisve devah santirbrahma santih sarvafn santih santireva santih sd ma santiredhi., lit. 'May the heavens bring us peace. May peace be with the skies, and may the skies shower us with peace. May there be peace on earth, and may the earth mother bring us peace. May there be peace with the waters, and may the waters bring us peace. May there be peace in the herbs, and may the herbs bring us peace. May peace be with the trees and may the trees bring us peace. Peace be with the divinities of the world, and may they bless us with peace. May the Great Lord of the universe bless us with peace, and may the Veda inspire us with peace. May all existence be at peace and may peace come from all existence to all. May there be peace only, universal peace for all. May that heavenly peace come and bless me. May It bless all.'

— Yajur veda 36.17 at the Internet Archive

As with all Dharmic Religions, (Hinduism, Jainism, Buddhism, and Sikhism), ahimsa (avoidance of violence) is a central concept.

=== Islam ===
According to Islamic eschatology, the whole world will be united under the leadership of imam Mahdi. At that time love, justice and peace will be so abundant that the world will be in the likeness of paradise.

=== Judaism ===
Judaism is not a pacifist religion. However, the concept of Tikkun olam (Repairing the World) is central to modern Rabbinic Judaism. Tikkun Olam is accomplished through various means, such as ritualistically performing God's commandments, charity, and social justice, as well as through example persuading the rest of the world to behave morally. According to some views, Tikkun Olam would result at the beginning of the Messianic Age. It has been said that in every generation, a person is born with the potential to be the spiritual Messiah. If the time is right for the Messianic Age within that person's lifetime, then that person will be the Mashiach. But if that person dies before he completes the mission of the Messiah, then that person is not the Messiah (Mashiach).

Specifically, in Jewish messianism it is considered that at some future time a Messiah (literally "an anointed King appointed by God") will rise up to bring all Jews back to the Land of Israel, and to establish God's Torah, followed by everlasting global peace and prosperity. This idea originates from passages in the Hebrew Bible and the Talmud.

For Torah will go forth from Zion and the Word of HaShem from Jerusalem. And He will judge between the nations and decide disputes for many peoples, and they will beat their swords into plowshares and their spears into pruning hooks; nation will not lift the sword against nation, neither will they learn war anymore.

— Isaiah 2:3–4

=== Jainism ===
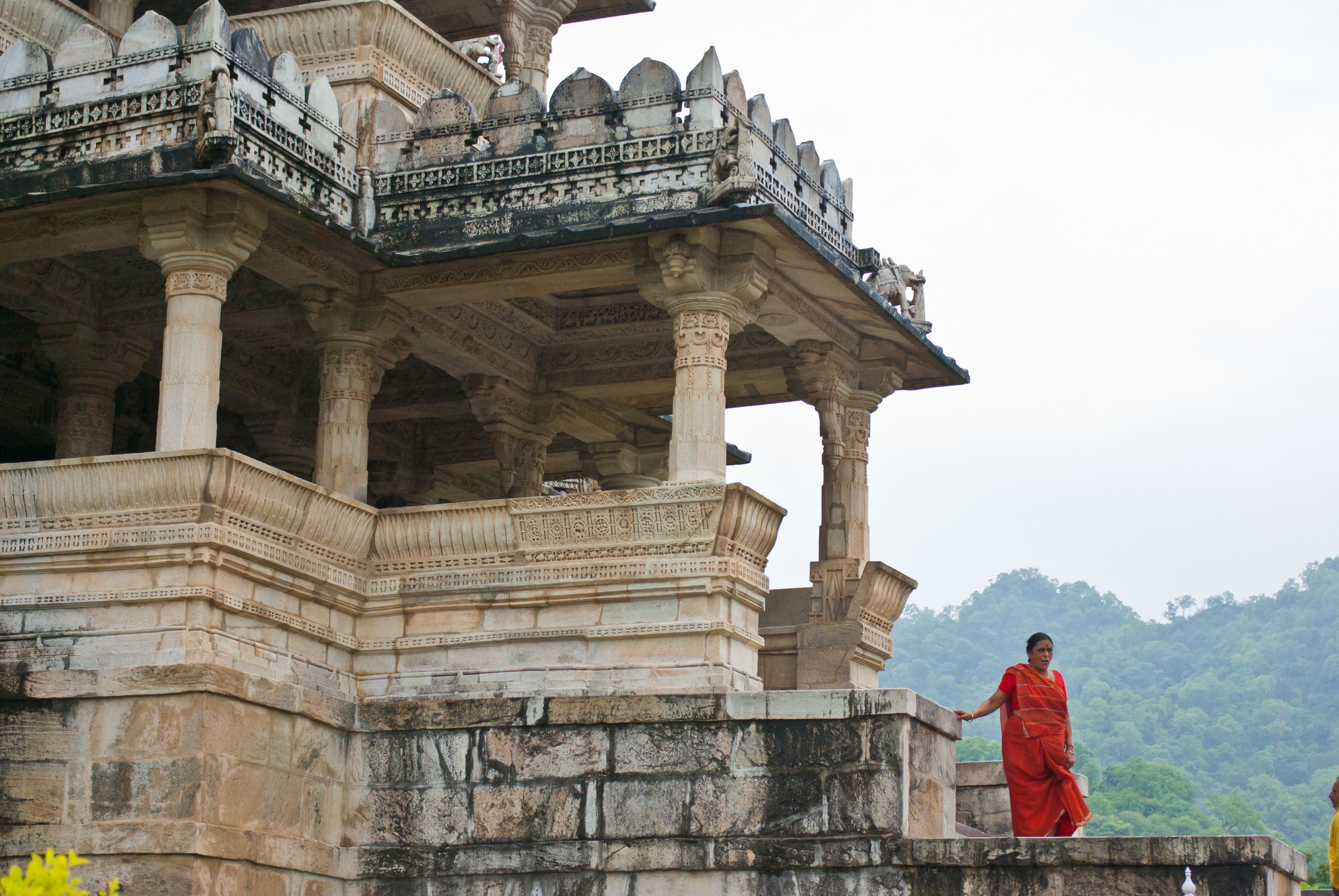
The Ranakpur Jain Temple, located in Ranakpur, India

Compassion for all life, human and non-human, is central to Jainism. They have adopted the wordings of Lord Mahavira Jiyo our Jeeno Do. Human life is valued as a unique, rare opportunity to reach enlightenment; to kill any person, no matter what crime he may have committed, is considered unimaginably abhorrent. It is a religion that requires monks and laity, from all its sects and traditions, to be vegetarian. Some Indian regions, such as Gujarat, have been strongly influenced by Jains and often the majority of the local Hindus of every denomination have also become vegetarian. Famous quote on world peace as per Jainism by a 19th-century Indian legend, Virchand Gandhi: "May peace rule the universe; may peace rule in kingdoms and empires; may peace rule in states and in the lands of the potentates; may peace rule in the house of friends and may peace also rule in the house of enemies." As with all Dharmic religions (Hinduism, Jainism, Buddhism, and Sikhism), ahimsa (avoidance of violence) is a central concept.

=== Sikhism ===
The Sikh religion preaches that peace comes from God. However, pacifism is not absolute in Sikh religion, and Sikhs have taken military action against oppression.

Sikh people believe that meditation, the means of communicating with God, is unfruitful without the noble character of a devotee, as there can be no worship without performing good deeds. Guru Nanak stressed now kirat karō: that a Sikh should balance work, worship, and charity, and should defend the rights of all creatures, and in particular, fellow human beings. They are encouraged to have a chaṛdī kalā, or optimistic – resilience, view of life. Sikh teachings also stress the concept of sharing—vaṇḍ chakkō—through the distribution of free food at Sikh gurdwaras (langar), giving charitable donations, and working for the good of the community and others (sēvā). Sikhs believe that no matter what race, sex, or religion one is, all are equal in God's eyes. Men and women are equal and share the same rights, and women can lead prayers. As with all Dharmic religions (Hinduism, Jainism, Buddhism, and Sikhism), ahimsa (avoidance of violence) is a central concept.

== See also ==
- Amity-enmity complex
- Armistice
- Ceasefire
- Family Federation for World Peace and Unification
- Global ceasefire
- Global peace system
- Global policeman
- Inner peace
- Interfaith dialogue
- International community
- International human rights law
- International security
- International Day of Non-Violence
- List of anti-war organizations
- List of civil rights leaders
- List of ongoing military conflicts
- List of peace activists
- Nobel Peace Prize
- Nonkilling
- Nonviolence
- Pacifism
- Peace movement
- Peace One Day
- Peace symbols
- Peace treaty
- Peace walk
- Perpetual peace
- Philosophy of happiness
- Preamble to the United Nations Charter
- Religion and peacebuilding
- University for Peace
- Utopia
- Utopian and dystopian fiction
- War resister
- War Resisters' International
- World government
- World Peace Council
- World Peace Foundation
- World union for peace and fundamental human rights and the rights of peoples
- World Peace and Other Fourth-Grade Achievements (2010 documentary film)
