= World Constitution and Parliament Association =

Organization working for global democracy

- World Constitution and Parliament Association
- Abbreviation: WCPA
- Nickname: WCPA
- Formation: 1958; 68 years ago
- Founder: Philip Isely, Margaret Isely
- Founded at: Denver, Colorado, United States
- Type: Nonprofit, NGO, INGO
- Purpose: World peace via democratic federal world government
- Region served: Worldwide
- Fields: World government
- Key people: Thane Read, Philip Isely, Margaret Isely, Terence P. Amerasinghe, Morikatsu Inagaki, Jagdish Gandhi, Glen T. Martin
- Formerly called: World Committee for a World Constitutional Convention

The World Constitution and Parliament Association (WCPA), formally known as the World Committee for a World Constitutional Convention (WCWCC), is an international committee established as an international non-governmental organization (INGO) dedicated to the establishment of world peace through a democratic federal world government. WCPA is responsible for advancing the work of the Provisional World Parliament and promoting the Constitution for the Federation of Earth (CFoE).

== History ==
In late 1950's, the Continuation Committee from the Peoples' World Convention Executive Committee on Arrangements, consisting of Philip Isely, Thane Read, Margaret Isely, and Marie Philips Scot, formulated a plan that would seek to admit delegates from both national governments and delegates from peoples of all countries to a Peoples' World Convention. The form of agreement was drafted by Thane Read and revised by Philip Isely. As the call for a World Constitutional Convention gained momentum, an U.S. Committee for a World Constitutional Convention was formed in 1958, later renamed as World Committee for a World Constitutional Convention (WCWCC) in 1959 with Philip Isely as Secretary. With established headquarters in Denver, Colorado in 1961, the World Committee also issued calls to support the World Constitution Coordinating Committee (WCCC), garnering committed delegates from 50 nations and endorsements from several heads of state. WCWCC later played a significant role in development of the CFoE.

In 1966, the organization was again renamed the 'World Constitution and Parliament Association (WCPA)', with Philip Isely serving as Secretary-General and Margaret Isely as Treasurer. Notably, their extensive correspondence with influential figures such as Dr. T. P. Amerasinghe of Sri Lanka and Dr. Reinhart Ruge of Mexico contributed to the growth and development of WCPA, eventually leading to their appointment as co-presidents. Together, they dedicated their efforts to advancing the cause of a World Constitution in their respective roles for many years. After the death of his first wife in 1997, Philip remarried in 2001, and he left WCPA in 2003, with Glen T. Martin assuming the role of Secretary-General.

== Constitution for the Federation of Earth ==
The Constitution for the Federation of Earth (CFoE), formulated by group of international legal experts between 1968 and 1991, is a comprehensive framework of a global federalist government. Today, the WCPA actively promotes its principles. Since 1982, under this system various meetings of activists, styled as sessions of a "Provisional World Parliament" have been convened and have enacted numerous proposed legislations on various global issues, though these meetings and acts remain unrecognized internationally. These efforts continue to affect the discourse surrounding global governance.

== See also ==
- Campaign for World Government
- World government
- World federalism
- World Constitutional Convention
- Constitution for the Federation of Earth
- Emergency Committee of Atomic Scientists
