= World Constitution Coordinating Committee =

International committee

- Abbreviation: WCCC
- Nickname: World Constitution Committee
- Founder: Thane Read
- Founded at: Phoenix, Arizona
- Type: Nonprofit
- Legal status: Committee
- Purpose: world peace, world constitution, democratic federal world government
- Headquarters: Phoenix, Arizona
- Location: Phoenix, Arizona, United States
- Key people: Thane Read; Janet Frenzel; Lloyd D. Oxley; Evelyn Martin; Morikatsu Inagaki

The World Constitution Coordinating Committee (WCCC) was an international committee led by Thane Read to build widespread support for the development and establishment of a World constitution. It was officially established in 1962. It was formed to address the mounting concern over the threat of atomic war and the pressing need for global peace and cooperation via establishing a World Federation governed by mutually constituted world law.

== History ==
The idea of holding a constitutional convention to develop a world constitution had been discussed and planned by various groups since the early 20th century.

=== Campaign for World Government ===
In 1937, the Campaign for World Government (CWG) was established to promote the idea of governments taking the initiative to organize a World Constitutional Convention. Despite introducing bills in various parliaments, tangible support for the convention did not materialize.

=== Peoples' World Convention ===
In a similar vein, the Henry Usborne's "Peoples' World Convention Plan" was launched, garnering approval from notable personalities like Albert Einstein, Boyd-Orr, Radhakrishnan, Albert Camus, Jacques Maritain, and Thomas Mann. This plan aimed to secure democratic elections in every country for delegates to a world convention. Although the plans were successful in 1950-51, no work was done for the development of the world constitution. It was decided that work on the world constitution would be carried out in upcoming world constituent assemblies.

== Thane Read, WCCC and World Constitutional Convention call ==
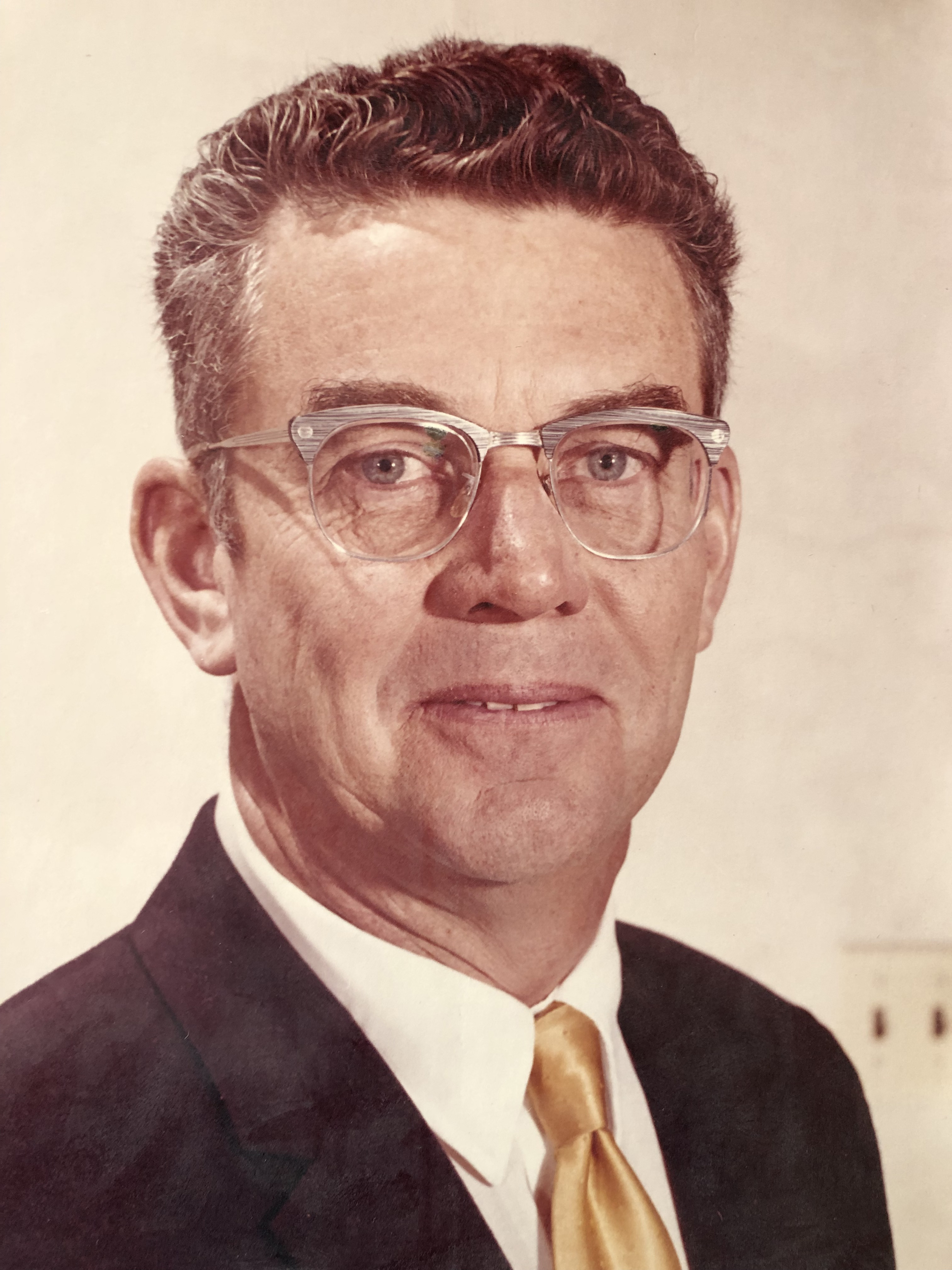
Portrait of Thane Read in 1962

In year 1958, Thane Read, an independent U.S. economist, began cultivating a joint appeal by renowned individuals from around the world, which culminated in the issuance of the "Call to all nations". The Call urged nations to send delegates to Geneva to a world convention to draft a constitution for a democratic federal World Government. The proposed constitution would then be submitted to all nations for ratification, leading to the establishment of a representative parliament for humanity.

In 1962, Thane Read was joined by the individual like Janet Frenzel, Lloyd D. Oxley, Evelyn Martin and Morikatsu Inagaki. Together they established there office in Phoenix, Arizona, US. The committee's central purpose was to promote the Call and garner support for the proposed world constitutional convention. It sought to engage governments, institutions, and individuals worldwide in discussions about the political possibilities of a World Federation governed by a democratic federal World government.

To achieve its objectives, the WCCC drafted a conditional agreement that prominent individuals were asked to sign. This agreement outlined specific conditions under which these individuals would lend their support to the Call. The committee engaged in extensive communication efforts with governments, urging them to participate actively in the constitutional convention. Additionally, they reached out to religious institutions, educational societies, political parties, labor unions, peace groups, and other organizations capable of taking action, seeking their support and collaboration in promoting the convention.

Other individuals like Philip Isely, Margaret Isely, Georgia Lloyd and groups also worked towards garnering support for this joint appeal.

== World Constitutional Convention call signatories ==
The "Call to all Nations" for World Constitutional Convention received support from several notable individuals. Notable signatories include Albert Szent-Györgyi, Frederick Sanger, Alfred Kastler, C. F. Powell, Max Born, Bertrand Russell, John Boyd Orr, Joseph Rotblat and Linus Pauling. Eminent leaders such as Martin Luther King Jr., Muhammad Ayub Khan, President of Pakistan; Francisco J. Orlich, President of Costa Rica; Milton Margoi, Prime Minister of Sierra Leone; Leopold Senghor, President of Senegal; Julius Nyerere, Prime Minister of Tanzania also endorsed the Call. Other advocates include Edward Condon, Edris Rice-Wray Carson, Harlow Shapley, Jean Orcel, Priyadaranjan Ray, René Dumont, Wilder Penfield, Brock Chisholm, Hugh B. Hester, David Alfaro Siqueiros, Lloyd Morain, Stuart Hall, Tamaki Uemura and many more.

Till 1963, World Constitutional Convention call had signatories numbering 1000 from 55 countries. This list of distinguished signatories grew larger in following years.

== World Constitutional Convention ==
In result of the call adoption, the World Constitutional Convention and the Peoples World Parliament were held in Interlaken, Switzerland, and Wolfach, Germany, in 1968. Over 200 participants from 27 countries attended these sessions, where the drafting of a world constitution for a global federal world government began. This would later lead to the development of the Constitution for the Federation of Earth.

== See also ==
- World constitution
- World government
- Constitution for the Federation of Earth
- Provisional World Parliament
