= World federalism =

Political idea of a global federal government

World federalism or global federalism, is a political ideology that advocates for a democratic, federal world government. The world federation would hold authority on issues of global concern, while member states would retain authority over local and national issues. Overall sovereignty over the world population would largely reside with the federal government.

World federalism is distinguished from unitary world government models by the principle of subsidiarity, in which decisions are made as much as possible at the most immediate level possible, preserving national agency to a large extent. Proponents maintain that a world federation offers a more effective and accountable global governance structure than the existing United Nations organization, while simultaneously allowing wide autonomy for continental, national, regional and local governments.

== Scope ==
Unlike the more widely used concept of world government, world federalism describes a specific form of global governance, i.e., that of a federal, democratic world republic. The difference between world federalism and other types of global governance are outlined below.

=== Distinction to the existing United Nations ===
The United Nations is not a legislative body and is thus limited to a mostly advisory role. Its stated purpose is to foster cooperation between existing national governments rather than exerting authority over them.

Furthermore, membership of the United Nations organization is reserved for states, not individuals (see World Citizenship).

=== Distinction to a unitary world government ===
A unitary world government would consist of a single, central government body with supreme sovereignty. While administrative subdivisions might exist, their powers are delegated by the central government. In a world federation based on subsidiarity, the delegation is the other way round, from local to central. Global federal government is subsidiary to local in that it only does what local government cannot.

Plans that sought to unify the known world by conquest have historically aimed at a centralized, unitary government, rather than a federal government. World federalists generally do not support violent paths towards a world federation (see World Federalism § Proposals for establishing a world federation)

=== Distinction to a world confederation ===
A confederation is a union of sovereign nations, which are pursuing a common cause. Member states in a confederation are sometimes free to secede from the confederation.

In a federation based on subsidiarity, nations choose to give up their sovereignty over global issues they cannot manage to a central authority empowered to manage these issues at the global level. Sovereignty over national issues remains with the nation.

Different forms of federalism can be applied at the global level. Traditional federalism is the model adopted by the United States, in which the States relinquish their sovereignty to the federal government, which in turn represents them in front of other nations. It constitutes a centralized model of world federalism. The most decentralized model of world federalism is the confederation of States, or world confederalism, which gives the States a higher degree of power and freedom in which countries preserve their sovereignty, relinquishing to the federal authority only the powers to manage and regulate intergovernmental relationships. The European Union can be considered an example of such a system of government, because its Member States preserve their sovereignty even though they relinquish part of it to the community's authorities in specific matters.

== History ==
=== Origins of the idea ===
World federalism has evolved from more general proposals for a world government. Proposals for a world government can be traced to antiquity when first aspirations of world rule appeared. Such aspirations are recorded in the Ancient Near East and later Greece, Rome and India. At least two similar concepts appeared independently, one in ancient China and later Japan, and another in the Inca Empire. These ideas were unhindered by the existence of other independent states, including competing empires, and the existence of unknown world of unknown size. Alexander the Great pursued the goal of conquering the entire known world and subjugating it under his rule.

Though characteristic element of premodern empires, the aspiration of world rule invariably expressed universal monarchy of divine kings and dynasties. Rome is the only state to establish universal empire under government other than monarchy. The Roman Republic attained supremacy over the Mediterranean by 189 BC. However, Rome continued to define client states as nominally independent for decades longer, and by 27 BC the Republic turned into universal monarchy without making a proposal for universal republic. The Romans talked about imperium sine fine (An empire without an end) but not res publica sine fine.

Nevertheless, the Romans had an idea similar to world citizens. The Edict of Caracalla in 212 AD granted the Roman citizenship to all inhabitants of the Roman Empire. The contemporary Han Dynasty performed a similar process with a longer-lasting result. They granted the status of Han Chinese to all inhabitants of their Empire and eventually formed a single ethnic group, the largest in the world today.

In Europe, the Roman concept of universal monarchy long outlived the Roman Empire, though after Dante Alighieri the general attitude towards universal monarchy changes from positive and nostalgic to negative. Predictions of universal monarchy or universal caesarism were made by such late thinkers as Johann Gottlieb Fichte, Fyodor Dostoyevski and Oswald Spengler. In the generation of Dostoyevsky and Spengler appeared theories of future global empire under undefined form of government.

Among the earliest proposals of world government other than monarchy and world state other than empire were the "universal republic" of Anacharsis Cloots (1792) and the "federation of free states" of Immanuel Kant (1795), where it was explicitly proposed as a means to securing world peace. A world parliament as integral part of a world republic was mentioned first by Pecqueur in 1842. The idea has been popularized by a number of prominent authors, such as Alfred Tennyson, F.A. Hayek, and H. G. Wells.

=== Before World War II ===
The Campaign for World Government was founded in 1937 by pacifists and feminists Rosika Schwimmer and Lola Maverick Lloyd. The campaign aimed to learn from the weaknesses of the League of Nations by establishing a federal world government as an effective means to abolish war. Such a democratic world government would represent the interests of the world's people, rather than merely the national interests of member states. The pamphlet "Chaos, War or a New World Order?" (1937) outlines the campaign's approach to put the demands into practise: a World Constitutional Convention would be held to lay the groundwork for a Federation of Nations with democratic elections. The pamphlet further includes several policy suggestions, e.g., universal membership, direct representation, separation of powers, abolition of military forces, standardization of an international date system, the peaceful transfer of people out of population-dense regions, and a combined global free-trade and command economy.

Advocacy tactics involved congressional testimony, lobbying of legislators, national letter-writing campaigns, and participation in world government conferences. The campaign succeeded in motivating the resolution at the 1938 New York State Constitutional Convention encouraging President Roosevelt to call a world constitutional convention, and several Congressional resolutions and bills, including the "Alexander Peace Bill" (H.J.R. 610, 76th Cong. (1940)), and the "Tenerowicz Peace Bill" (H.J.R. 131, 77th Cong. (1941)). The organization was also one of the few independent observers of the 1944 Dumbarton Oaks conference at which the United Nations was first planned.

The rise of nationalism and the growing threat of fascism in Europe caused a resurgence of the idea of a unified world under democratic principles. With the release of the book Union Now, Clarence Streit proposed a political union of democratic nations. The United States, United Kingdom, Canada, Australia, New Zealand, South Africa, Ireland, France, Belgium, the Netherlands, Switzerland, Denmark, Norway, Sweden and Finland were to form the seed for a democratic world republic. A world congress, made up of a House of Representative and a Senate should decide on matters related to defence, trade and currency.

During World War II, multiple other world federalist organizations were founded, especially in the United States. Inspired by Clarence Streit's Union Now, Harris Wofford Jr. founded the Student Federalists in 1942. The organization's success prompted Newsweek to predict he would become President of the United States.

The 1943 book One World by the Republican Wendell L. Willkie about his world tour through the Allied countries became an instant bestseller, further promoting the concept of world federalism and decolonisation to a wider audience. The publication of Emery Reves' The Anatomy of Peace in 1945, translated into thirty languages, further popularised the idea and was publicly endorsed by Albert Einstein.

=== After World War II ===
In 1947, the Committee to Frame a World Constitution was founded, releasing "The Preliminary Draft of a World Constitution" in 1948.

Also in 1947, over 50 world federalist organizations formulated the Montreux Declaration, encapsulating the demands of the world federalist movement in light of WWII:

We world federalists are convinced that the establishment of a world federal government is the crucial problem of our time. Until it is solved, all other issues, whether national or international, will remain unsettled. It is not between free enterprise and planned economy, nor between capitalism and communism that the choice lies, but between federalism and power politics. Federalism alone can assure the survival of man.

The United World Federalists emerged as the main advocacy group for world federalism in the United States after WWII. The United World Federalists was a non-partisan, non-profit organization with members in forty-eight states, founded in Asheville, North Carolina on February 23, 1947, as the result of a merger of five existing world government groups: Americans United for World Government; World Federalists, U.S.A.; Student Federalists; Georgia World Citizens Committee; and the Massachusetts Committee for World Federation. The organization was renamed to World Federalists, USA (1960s), World Federalists Association (1970s) and then Citizens for Global Solutions, which is active to this day.

==== Convention to propose amendments to the United States Constitution ====
In 1949, six U.S. states—California, Connecticut, Florida, Maine, New Jersey, and North Carolina—applied for an Article V convention to propose an amendment "to enable the participation of the United States in a world federal government". Multiple other state legislatures introduced or debated the same proposal. These resolutions were part of this effort.

During the 81st United States Congress (1949–1951), multiple resolutions were introduced favoring a world federation.

==== World Citizen movement ====
In 1948, Garry Davis entered a meeting of the newly founded United Nations General Assembly, in which a vote on the Universal Declaration of Human Rights was expected to fail due to conflicts of national interests. He ripped his US passport, declared himself "World Citizen Number One", and asked for asylum in the United Nations, whose assembly hall had been declared international territory for the duration of the meeting. He was promptly arrested.

After his release, Davis and several supporters founded "Operation Oran", entering a session of the United Nations General Assembly, where he gave a short speech before being escorted out of the hall:

"I interrupt you in the name of the people of the world not represented here. Though my words may be unheeded, our common need for world law and order can no longer be disregarded.

We, the people, want the peace which only a world government can give. The sovereign states you represent divide us and lead us to the abyss of total war.

I call upon you no longer to deceive us by this illusion of political authority. I call upon you to convene forthwith a World Constitutional Assembly to raise the standard around which all men can gather, the standard of true peace, of One Government for One World."

Prominent people, such as Albert Camus, André Breton, Albert Schweitzer, and Albert Einstein, publicly supported Garry Davis, fueling the sudden public interest in the idea. The first meeting of the World Citizens' Movement in Paris a month after his speech gathered 25,000 people. Garry Davis founded the World Service Authority, promoting the idea of world citizenship. Over 750,000 people from over 150 countries registered as world citizens between 1948 and 1950, and over 300 cities declared themselves as world citizen communities. Davis further founded the World Government of Citizens in his hometown of Ellsworth in 1953.

=== Present Day ===
The movement for world federalism has declined from its peak in the 1950s, due to a lack of funding and successors for the activists who founded the original world federalist organizations.

Major active world federalist organizations include World Constitution and Parliament Association (WCPA), Citizens for Global Solutions and Democracy Without Borders.

The World Federalist Movement/Institute for Global Policy acts as the umbrella organization for world federalist advocacy, albeit its focus has shifted away from its original core issue towards projects like Responsibility to Protect and the Coalition for the International Criminal Court.

== Proposals for establishing a world federation ==
Flag of the United Nations

There are a number of proposals for the establishment of a world federation:

Reform of the UN and existing international institutions:

- Incremental changes of the UN, for example through the inclusion of an elected UN Parliament
- League of Democratic Nations which supports a federation of nations within the UN.
- Direct reform of the UN Charter, e.g., via the mechanism outlined in Art. 109(3) ("San Francisco Promise")
- Strengthening and democratization of existing global institutions, such as the WTO

Regional Unification:

- Regional unification, through organizations like the African Union and the European Union.

Unofficial Earth flag by Oskar Pernefeldt is often used by world federalists to represent planet Earth and humanity

Other:

- Entirely new world governance institutions outside of existing institutions ("global grassroots democracy")
- Federation under the existing institutions of the constitutional order of the United States ("libertarian interstate federalism")

Numerous books and articles have been written on the practical implementation of world federalist goals.

A comprehensive analysis and a roadmap to world federalism is presented in the book World Federalist Manifesto, Guide to Political Globalization, in which the author presents a model of world federalism divided into international legislative, executive, judicial and financial branches and the world government shares the authority with Member States, in a way that both are sovereign within their respective sphere of competence.

== Provisional world federation ==
=== Albert Einstein and world constituent assemblies ===
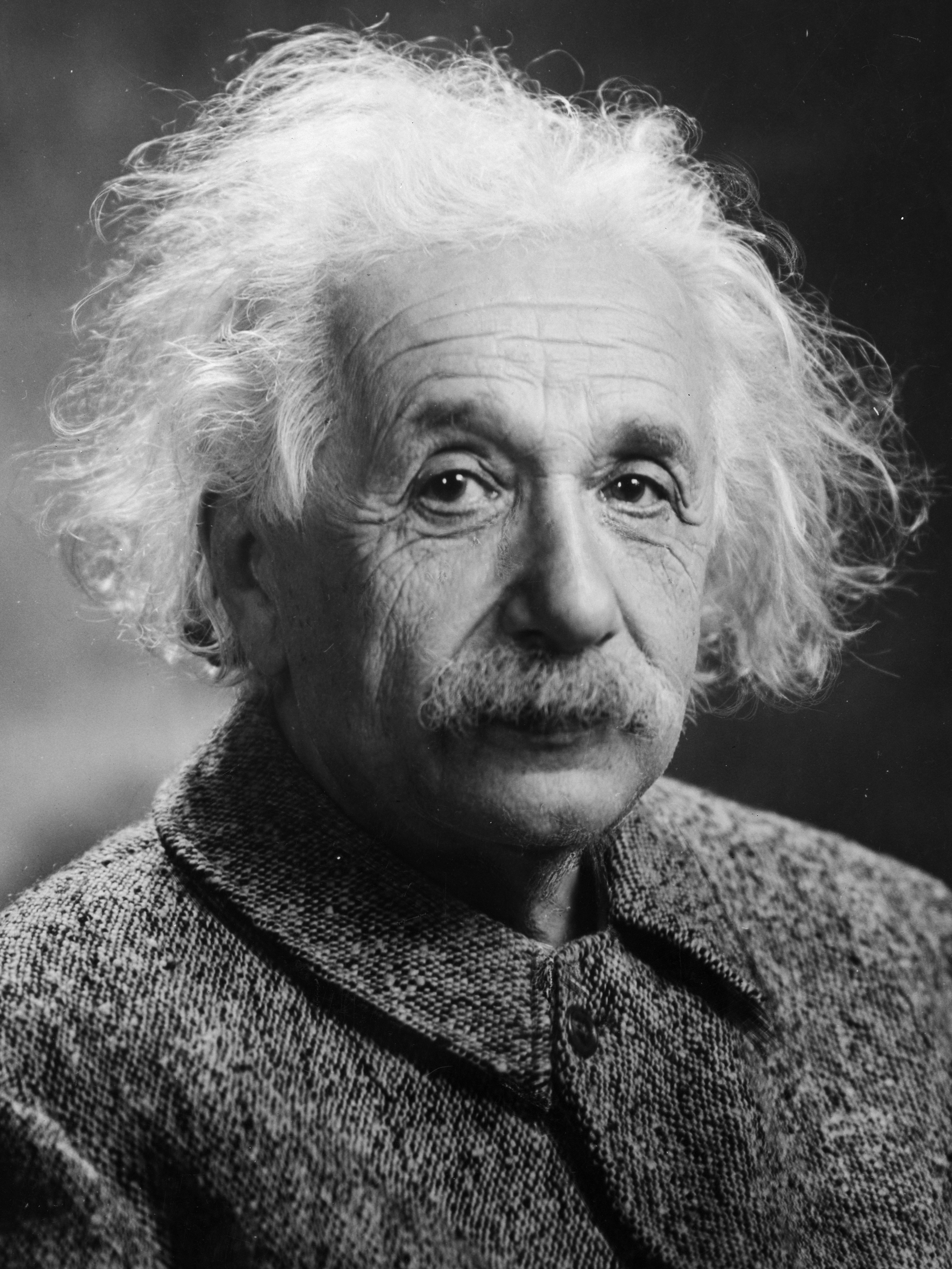
Einstein, 1947 (aged 68)

Albert Einstein grew increasingly convinced that the world was veering off course. He arrived at the conclusion that the gravity of the situation demanded more profound actions and the establishment of a "world government" was the only logical solution. In his "Open Letter to the General Assembly of the United Nations" of October 1947, Einstein emphasized the urgent need for international cooperation and the establishment of a world government. In the year 1948, Einstein invited United World Federalists, Inc.(UWF) president Cord Meyer to a meeting of ECAS and joined UWF as a member of the advisory board. Einstein and ECAS assisted UEF in fundraising and provided supporting material. Einstein described United World Federalists as: "the group nearest to our aspirations".

There is no salvation for civilization, or even the human race, other than the creation of a world government.- Albert Einstein, Letter to World Federalists, Stockholm Congress, 1949

Einstein and other prominent figures sponsored the Peoples' World Convention (PWC), which took place in 1950-51 and later continued in the form of world constituent assemblies in 1968, 1977, 1978–79, and 1991. This effort was successful in creating a world constitution, Constitution for the Federation of Earth and a Provisional World Government.

=== World constitution and Provisional World Parliament ===
The Constitution for the Federation of Earth, drafted by international legal experts in 1968 and finalized in 1991, is a world constitution of a world federalist government, and its work today is being carried forward under the Provisional World Government. Fourteen parliamentary sessions of a Provisional World Parliament have been held under the framework of this constitution from 1982 to the present and have passed dozens of acts of legislation on issues of global concern.

== Debates ==
Debate around world government falls into four broad categories, which is often applied also to world federalism:

=== Feasibility ===
The establishment of a world federation would require extraordinary amounts of coordination and trust from all nations of the world, which are in economic and political competition with each other. Critics argue that world federalism is thus an unreachable utopia.

Proponents of world federalism point to existential crises, such as climate change, war and pandemics, which make global coordination necessary and inevitable.

An argument revolving around political realism asserts that, while conventional approaches (diplomacy, deterrence, disarmament, international organizations, etc.) have not avoided the most undesirable outcomes, world federalism instead is a realistic extension of the proven concepts of rule of law and liberal democracy to the global level.

=== Desirability ===
Critics argue that a concentration of power on a global level would raise the risks and probability of tyranny, deterioration of human rights, and cultural homogenization.

Proponents of world federalism point out that democratic and republican principles are at the core of world federalism, which are commonly seen as safeguards against tyranny and oppression in nation states. Realizing the inherent risks of the concentration of power, world federalists advocate a vertical separation of powers between different levels of government (subsidiarity), horizontal separation of powers between different government branches (checks and balances), democratic participation, and constitutionally enshrined human and civil rights.

=== Sufficiency ===
Critics argue that the problems world federalism proposes to solve (e.g. climate change, war, pandemics, hunger) are too big to be solved by political means only, i.e. even if a world federation existed, it would not be capable of alleviating these issues.

World federalists argue that these issues originate from the insistence on national sovereignty and the lack of democratic structures at the global level. Effective global governance could therefore deal directly with the root cause of these problems.

=== Necessity ===
Critics argue that it is unnecessary to establish a world federation to solve global problems. They point to existing structures of global governance, such as international organizations and the United Nations.

World federalists maintain that current structures of global governance are not capable of enforcing decisions, and that they are not democratically representing the world's population.

== In popular culture ==
A world federation has been mentioned in several works of fiction, along with more general concepts of world government.

- Anticipations by H. G. Wells
- The Shape of Things to Come by H. G. Wells
- Men Like Gods by H. G. Wells
- Looking Backwards by Edward Bellamy
- The World Set Free by H. G. Wells
- Starship Troopers by Robert A. Heinlein

== Existing world federalist organizations and campaigns ==
World Federalist Movement/Institute for Global Policy member organizations	World Federalist Movement/Institute for Global Policy associated organizations

=== Europe ===
Organization	Abbreviation	Headquarters	Country	Founded
Weltföderalisten Deutschlands e.V.		Hamburg	Germany	1949 (defunct)
Weltbürgervereinigung e.V.		Oldenburg	Germany	2007 (defunct)
Association of World Citizens Deutschland e.V	AWC	Freiburg	Germany	
Center for United Nations Constitutional Research	CUNCR	Brussels	Belgium	
Democracy Without Borders	DWB	Berlin	Germany	2003
Equilibrismus e.V.		Munich	Germany	2005
Eine-Welt-Partei e.V.		Wiesbaden	Germany	2003 (defunct)
Federal Union			United Kingdom	1938
Global Voice		Amsterdam	Netherlands	2004
Global Week of Action for a World Parliament (Democracy Without Borders)		Berlin	Germany	2013
One World Trust		Wotton-under-Edge	United Kingdom	1951
The Federal Trust		London	United Kingdom	1945
Together First		London	United Kingdom	
UN Parliamentary Assembly Campaign (Democracy Without Borders)		Berlin	Germany	2007
World Parliament Experiment (Democracy Without Borders)		Berlin	Germany	2019
Én Verden		Oslo	Norway	1970
FN-forbundet		Copenhagen	Denmark	1970
Movimento Federalista Europeo		Pavia	Italy	1943
Weltföderalisten der Schweiz		Morges	Switzerland	1960
WF Beweging Nederland		Den Haag	Netherlands	1948
Union of European Federalists		Brussels	Belgium	1946
Union of European Federalists France		Lyon	France	
Union of European Federalists Spain			Spain	2012
World Democratic Governance Project Association	apGDM-WDGpa	Barcelona	Spain	
Young European Federalists	JEF	Brussels	Belgium	1972
United World	UW	Netherlands	Netherlands	2020
Weltstaat-Liga		Munich	Germany	1947 (defunct)

=== Americas ===
Organization	Abbreviation	Headquarters	Country	Founded
Center for Development of International Law		New York	USA	
Centro Mexicano de Responsibilidad Global	CEMERG		Mexico	
Citizens for Global Solutions	CGS	Washington, D.C.	USA	2003
Coalition for the International Criminal Court	CICC	New York	USA	1995
Democracia Global	DG	Buenos Aires	Argentina	
Democratic World Federalists	DWF	San Francisco	USA	2004
Earth Constitution Institute	ECI	Virginia	USA	2012
The Streit Council, Inc. (formerly Federal Union, Inc.)	SC	Washington, D.C.	USA	1939
Institute for Global Leadership		Worcester	USA	2001
International Coalition for the Responsibility to Protect		New York	USA	2008
United World	UW	United States	USA	2020
Vote World Parliament		Shawville	Canada	2004
World Constitution and Parliament Association	WCPA	Denver, Colorado	USA	1958
Workable World Trust		St. Paul	USA	2014
World Federalist Movement/Institute for Global Policy	WFM	New York	USA	1947
World Federalist Movement Canada	WFMC	Ottawa	Canada	1951
World Federalist Movement Toronto Chapter		Toronto	Canada	
World Service Authority		Washington, D.C.	USA	1953
Young World Federalists	YWF	West Palm Beach	USA	2019

=== Africa ===
Organization	Abbreviation	Headquarters	Country	Founded
Advocates for Youth and Health Development		Abuja	Nigeria	2008
African Federation Association - WFM Uganda		Kampala	Uganda	1993
Citizens for Development Network		Kigali	Rwanda	2014

=== Asia and Pacific ===
Organization	Abbreviation	Headquarters	Country	Founded
Asian Youth Center		Hyderabad	India	1984
Global Federal League	GFL	Bhubaneswar	India	2021
Japanese Parliamentary Committee for World Federation	JPCWF	Tokyo	Japan	1945
One World		Jerusalem	Israel	
South Asian Federalists		New Delhi	India	
The Federal Government of the World (Beta)	FGW	Tokyo	Japan	2021
The Global Trust		Rajkot	India	1996
United World	UW	Iran	Iran	2020
WFM Asian Center		Osaka	Japan	
World Citizens Association of Australia	WCAA	Sydney	Australia	
World Party Japan		Matsudo	Japan	1998

=== Other organizations ===
- Alliance for a responsible, plural and united world
- ICE Coalition
- UN 2020
- World Alliance to Transform the United Nations
- World Government Institute
- World Government Research Network

== Lists of World Federalists ==
=== Scientists ===
- Albert Einstein
- Corrado Gini
- Linus Pauling
- John G. Kemeny
- Margaret Mead
- Leo Szilard

=== Politicians ===
- Jawaharlal Nehru
- Winston Churchill
- Harry S. Truman
- Lord Lothian
- Ahmed Ebrahim Haroon Jaffer
- Henri Huber
- Kurt Borter
- Ratan Kumar Nehru
- Sumner Welles
- Thomas K. Finletter
- Henry Stimson
- Chester Bowles

=== Activists and other political figures ===
- Benjamin Ferencz
- Lola Maverick Lloyd
- Anacharsis Cloots

=== Artists/Writers ===
- Albert Camus
- H. G. Wells
- Isaac Asimov
- E.B. White

=== Philosophers and religious thinkers ===
- Bertrand Russell
- Sri Aurobindo
- Martin Niemöller
- Pope John XXIII
- ʻAbdu'l-Bahá

=== Other prominent figures ===
- Douglas MacArthur
- Henry H. Arnold
- Owen Young
- Harris Bullis

== See also ==
- Cosmopolitan democracy
- Cosmopolitanism
- Global governance
- Humanism
- International Criminal Court
- International relations
- Panhumanism
- New world order (Baháʼí)
- Regionalism (politics)
- World Federalist Movement/Institute for Global Policy
- World Constitution and Parliament Association
- Italian Unionist Movement
