= World Constitutional Convention =

1968 meeting of world delegates

- Date: August 27 – September 12, 1968
- Venue: Theater Hall of Congress Kursaal, Interlaken, Switzerland; City Hall of Wolfach, Germany
- Also known as: World Constituent Assembly (WCA); First World Constituent Assembly
- Type: Constituent assembly
- Cause: Peoples' World Convention; World Constitutional Convention call
- Motive: world peace, World constitution, democratic federal world government
- Participants: 200
- Outcome: Constitution for the Federation of Earth
- Website: www.ef-gov.org/en/

The World Constitutional Convention (WCC), also known as the World Constituent Assembly (WCA) or the First World Constituent Assembly, took place in Interlaken, Switzerland and Wolfach, Germany, 1968. The convention aimed to foster global cooperation and world peace through the development of a world constitution and establishment of a democratic federal world government.

The initiative to convene the convention was led by World Constitution Coordinating Committee, who sought support from notable individuals around the world. The "Call to all nations," an appeal signed by prominent figures, urged countries to send delegates to Geneva for the historic World Constitutional Convention. Several Nobel laureates were among the notable signatories of the call. Other notable figures such as Edward Condon, Edris Rice-Wray Carson, and Martin Luther King Jr. endorsed it as well.

Hundreds of participants from various countries attended the convention in 1968, where a proposed constitution was drafted. The World Committee for a World Constitutional Convention, subsequently renamed the World Constitution and Parliament Association, later organized a Second World Constituent Assembly in Innsbruck, Austria, in 1977. During the 1977 assembly, the delegates adopted the "Constitution for the Federation of Earth".

After its adoption, the WCPA issued a call for ratification, urging nations and peoples of Earth to endorse the constitution and copies of the prepared constitution were sent to various entities, including the United Nations, national governments, and universities, seeking their support and cooperation in the ratification process. The constitution had not been ratified by any country as of 2024.

== Background ==
=== Albert Einstein and Peoples' World Convention (PWC) ===
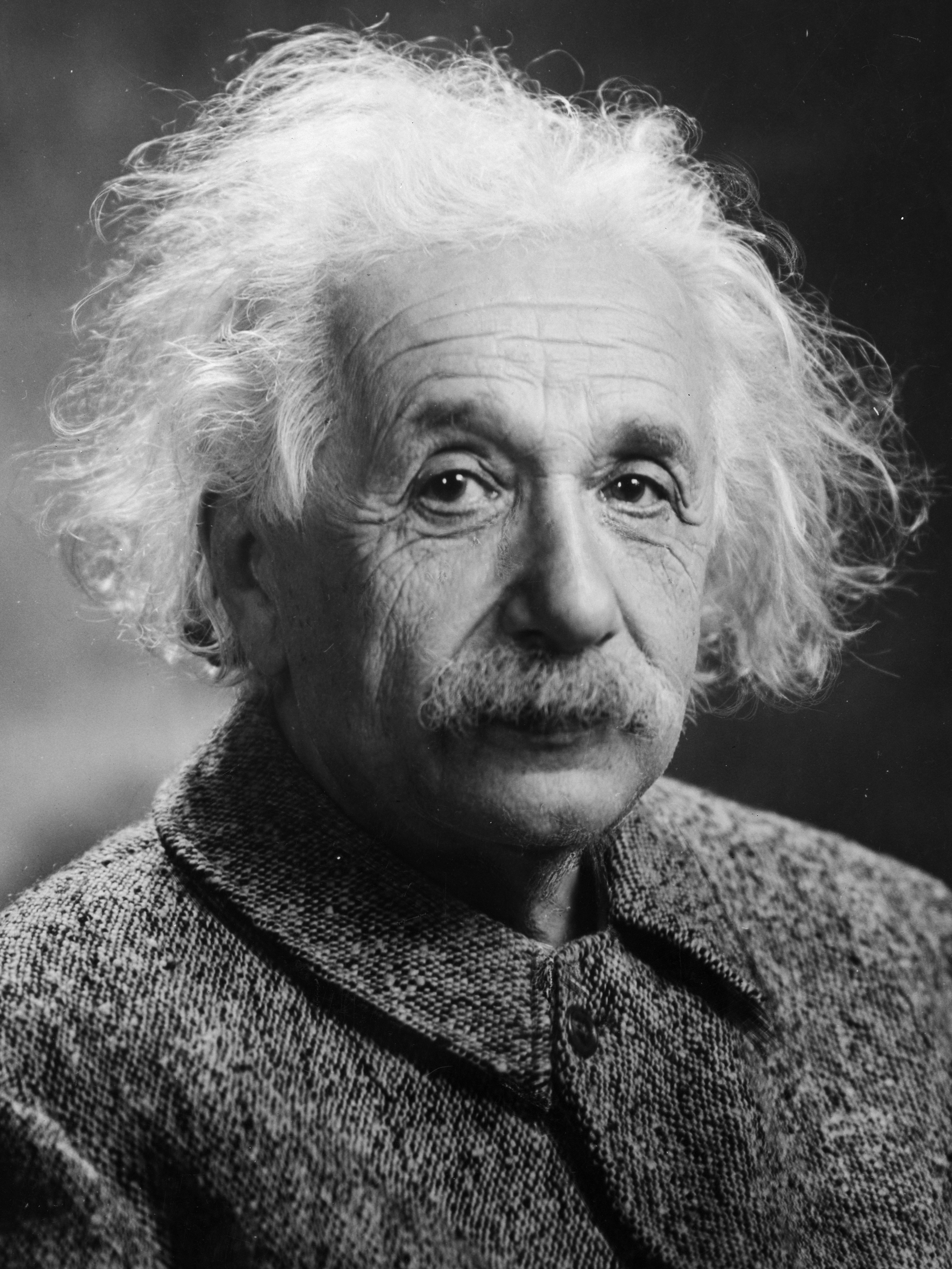
Einstein, 1947 (aged 68)

Albert Einstein grew increasingly convinced that the world was veering off course. He arrived at the conclusion that the gravity of the situation demanded more profound actions and the establishment of a "world government" was the only logical solution. In his "Open Letter to the General Assembly of the United Nations" of October 1947, Einstein emphasized the urgent need for international cooperation and the establishment of a world government. In the year 1948, Einstein invited United World Federalists, Inc. (UWF) president Cord Meyer to a meeting of ECAS and joined UWF as a member of the advisory board. Einstein and ECAS assisted UWF in fundraising and provided supporting material. Einstein described United World Federalists as: "the group nearest to our aspirations". Einstein and other prominent figures such as Gerhard Domagk, Robert Hutchins, Kerstin Hesselgren, John Steinbeck, William Beveridge, Hu Shih, Albert Camus, Toyohiko Kagawa, Yehudi Menuhin, Jacques Maritain, John Boyd Orr, Thomas Mann, Sarvepalli Radhakrishnan, Roberto Rossellini and Hans Thirring sponsored the Peoples' World Convention (PWC) also known as Peoples' World Constituent Assembly (PWCA), which took place in 1950–51 and later continued in the form of world constituent assemblies in 1968, 1977, 1978–79, and 1991. 500 people from 45 countries attended the Peoples' World Convention (PWC) at Palais Electoral, Geneva, Switzerland from December 30, 1950, to January 5, 1951.

=== World Constitution Coordinating Committee ===
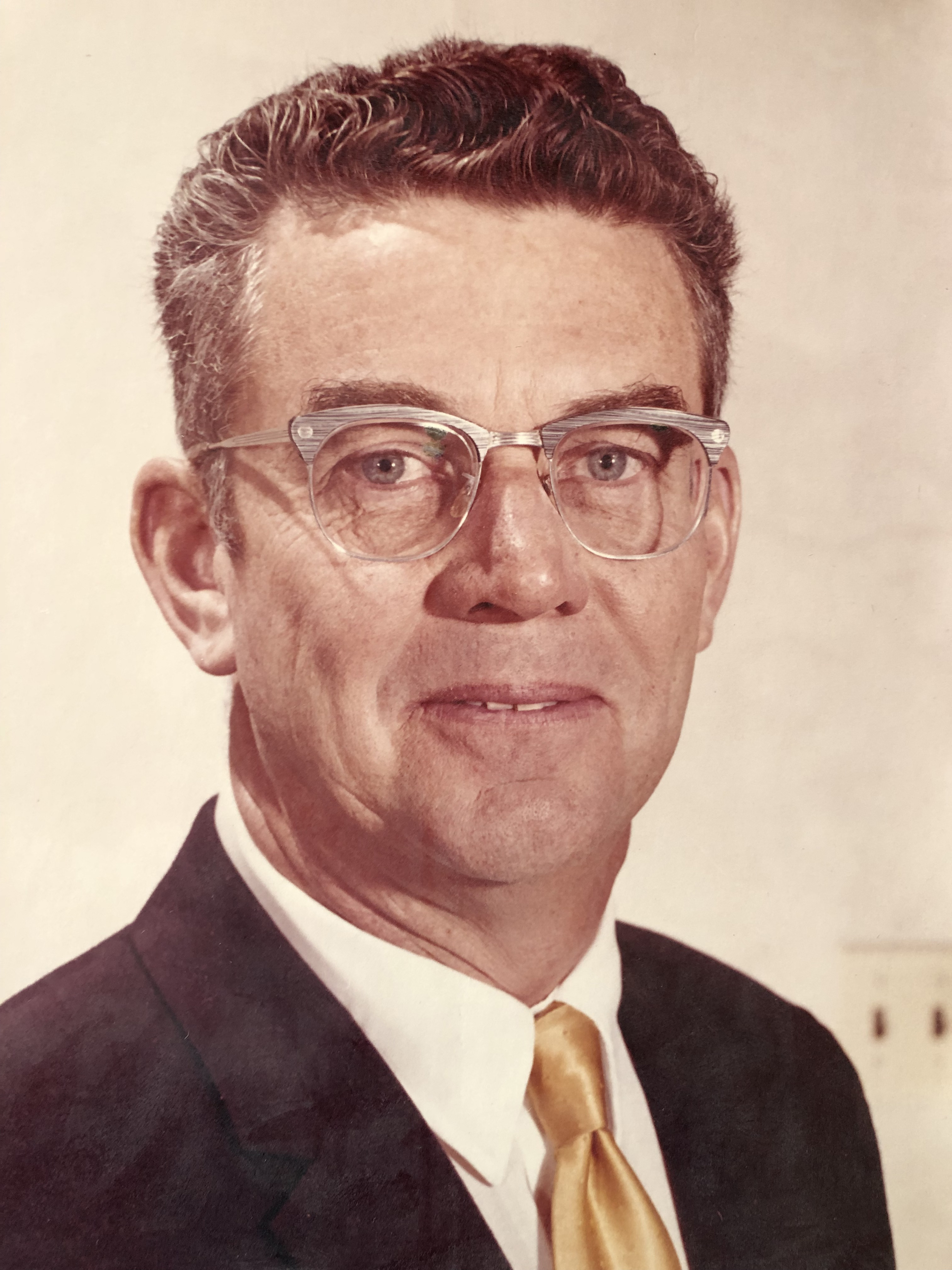
Portrait of Thane Read in 1962

In 1958, Thane Read, an independent U.S. economist, decided to consider a means to foster global cooperation and peace through the establishment of a democratic federal world government. He initiated the "Call to all nations," an appeal signed by individuals from around the world, urging countries to send delegates to Geneva for a World Constitutional Convention. The primary objective of this convention was to draft a constitution that would pave the way for a representative parliament representing all of humanity.

Joining Read in his mission were Janet Frenzel, Lloyd D. Oxley, Evelyn Martin, and Morikatsu Inagaki, who collectively established an office in Phoenix, Arizona, US, as the World Constitution Coordinating Committee, to garner support for the proposed World Constitutional Convention. The committee engaged in extensive communication efforts with governments, religious institutions, educational societies, political parties, labor unions, and various organizations capable of effecting change, seeking their collaboration in advocating for the convention. The appeal received overwhelming support from prominent individuals across diverse fields and countries. Nobel laureates, including Albert Szent-Györgyi, Linus Pauling, and Bertrand Russell, endorsed the Call, alongside eminent leaders like Martin Luther King Jr., President of Pakistan Muhammad Ayub Khan, and President of Costa Rica Francisco J. Orlich and many more. This widespread support set the stage for the World Constitutional Convention and the Peoples World Parliament, held in Interlaken, Switzerland, and Wolfach, Germany, in 1968. Attended by over 200 participants from 27 countries, these sessions marked the beginning of drafting a world constitution for a global federal government, ultimately leading to the development of the Constitution for the Federation of Earth.

=== World Committee for a World Constitutional Convention ===
As the call for a World Constitutional Convention gained momentum, an U.S. Committee for a World Constitutional Convention was formed in 1958 later renamed as World Committee for a World Constitutional Convention (WCWCC) in 1959 with Philip Isely as Secretary. With established headquarters in Denver, Colorado in 1961, World Committee also issued calls to support the World Constitution Coordinating Committee (WCCC) and later played a significant roles in development of the world constitution. In 1966, World Committee for a World Constitutional Convention (WCWCC) was again renamed as World Constitution and Parliament Association (WCPA).

=== Consultative Council to the World Constitutional Convention ===
A consultative council for the World Constitutional Convention was also established in 1967, whose task was to engage in research and provide advice on specific topics connected with the drafting and ratification of the World Constitution. Max Habicht was the organizing chairman of the consultative council. Later, in late 1972, Consultative Council to the World Constitutional Convention (CCWCC) was succeeded by World Federal Authority Committee (WFAC).

== Early debates ==
=== First Preparatory Congress ===
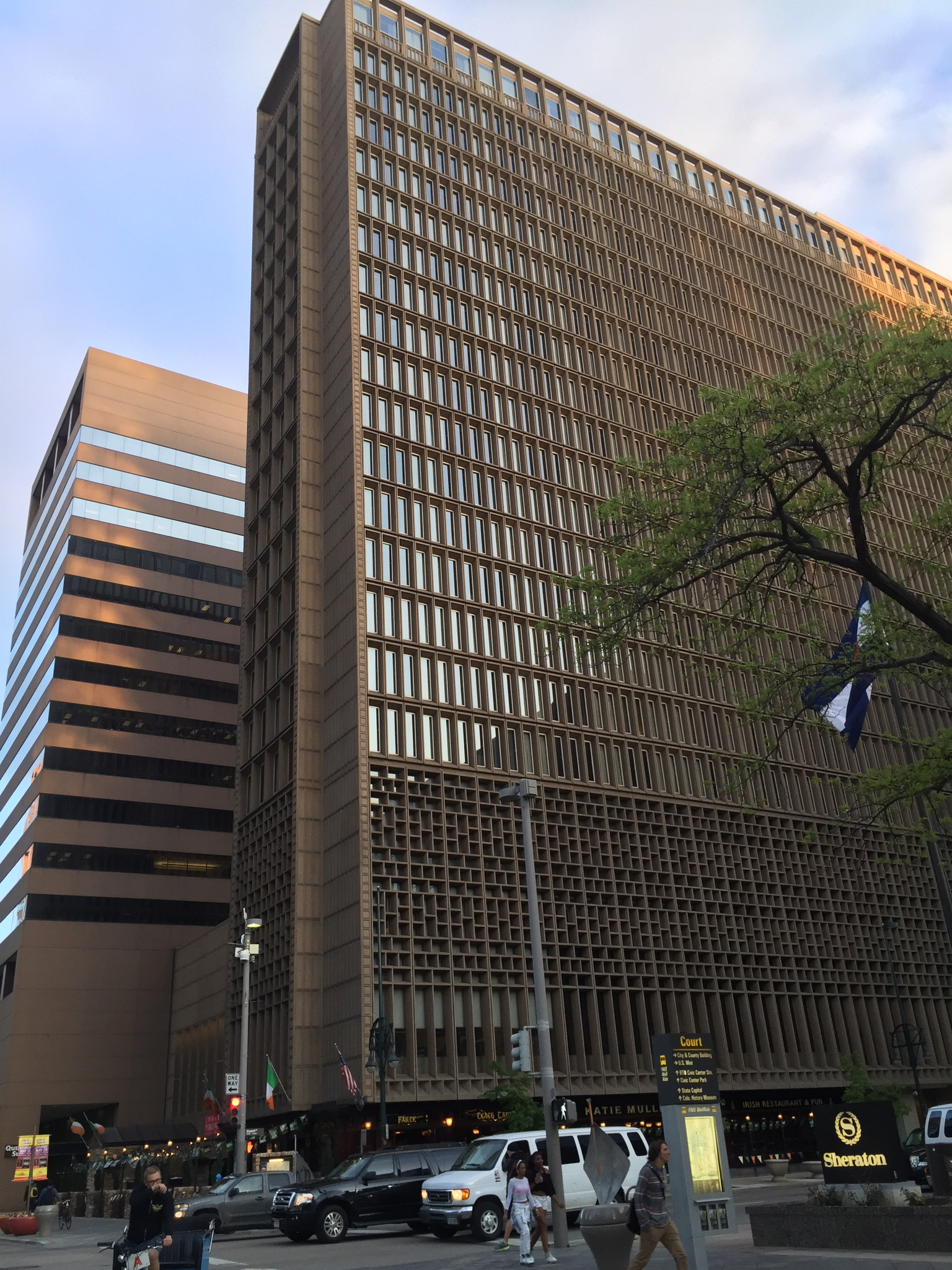
Denver Sheraton Hotel (then Denver Hilton Hotel) of Denver, Colorado, venue of the First Preparatory Congress

In 1963, the first Preparatory Congress took place at the Denver Hilton Hotel in Denver, Colorado, US, from September 3 to 8. World Committee for a World Constitutional Convention (WCWCC) was the organizer of the congress with Victor W. Haflich, then Member of the State Legislature, Kansas, President; Dr. Neal Bishop, Vice President; Professor Agnes B.Hatfield, Secretary; T. E. Robertson Jr., Treasurer and Philip Isely as executive director of committee. There were 126 participants from 15 countries. World Parliament Association (WPA) delegation, Josué de Castro, Mary Tibaldi Chiesa and Janet Hartog from Europe also attended. Meeting was chaired by Josue de Castro, who was the Ambassador of Brazil in Geneva, Switzerland at the time, he was elected as President of World Committee for a World Constitutional Convention (WCWCC) along with Philip Isely as Secretary General.

During this congress, a call was issued to define the basic terms for the upcoming Convention and to invite people and governments from all nations to send delegates. This initial gathering laid the groundwork for the formal proceedings of the convention and generated widespread interest in the prospect of creating a democratic federal World Government. Till that time World Constitutional Convention call had signatories numbering 1000 from 55 countries.

=== Second Preparatory Congress ===
In 1965, the second Preparatory Congress or Milan Congress was convened with the co-operation of Mary Tibaldi Chiesa in Milan, Italy. During this congress, specific terms and guidelines were established to commence the World Constitutional Convention and Peoples World Parliament. The delegates present at Milan debated whether delegates from national governments alone or delegates representing the peoples of the world should have the upper hand at the World Constituent Convention or Assembly. A decision to hold Peoples World Parliaments concurrently with preparatory congresses of delegates from national governments was made.

=== Third Preparatory Congress ===
In 1966, the third Preparatory Congress or Geneva Congress was held in Geneva, Switzerland. This congress played a crucial role in setting the stage for the World Constitutional Convention to be held in the subsequent year. Delegates at the Geneva congress finalized the terms and conditions for commencing the Convention and Parliament at Interlaken and Wolfach in 1968.

== World Constitutional Convention and Peoples World Parliament ==
Venues of the Main Sessions of the World Constitutional Convention and the Peoples World Parliament

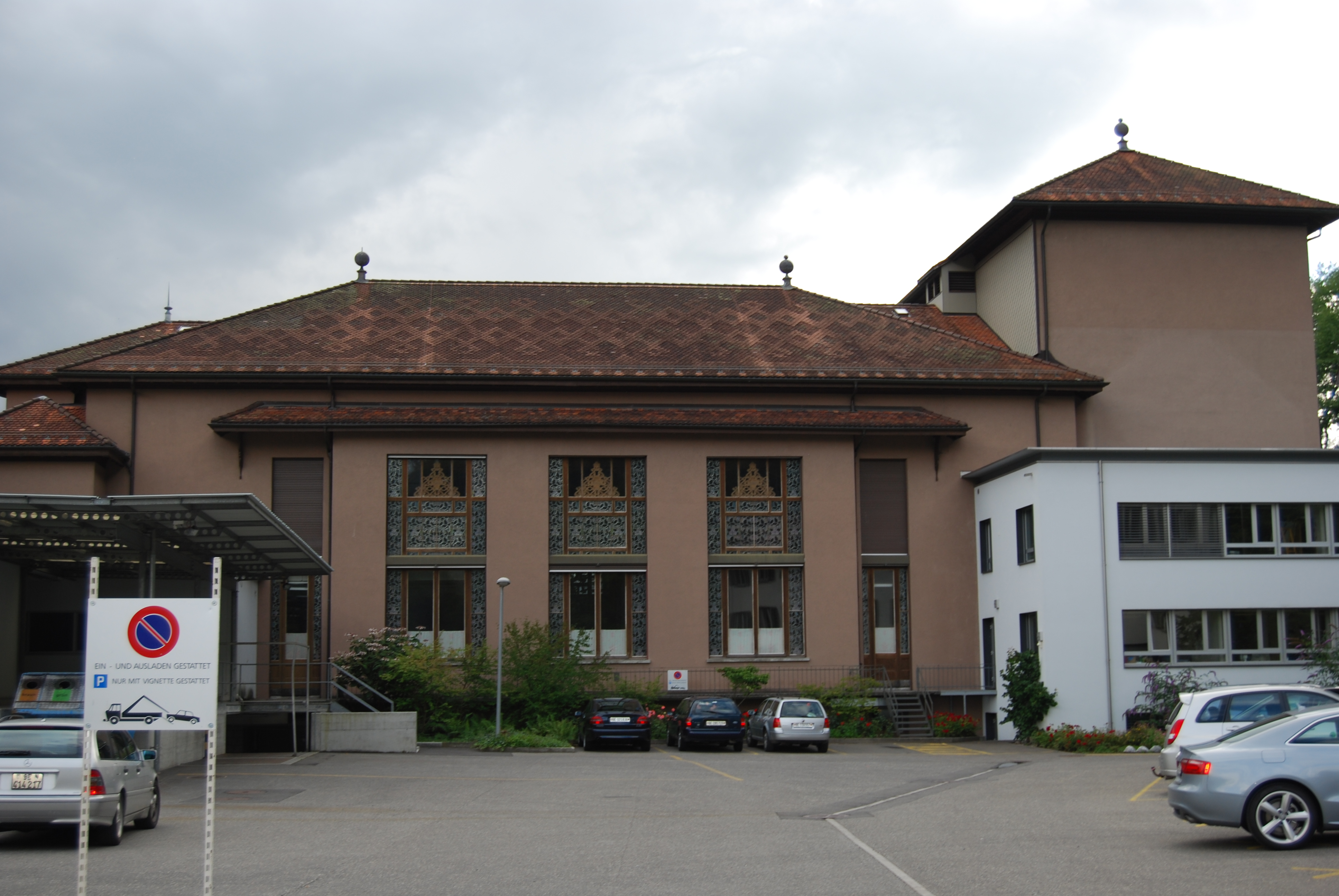
Theater Hall of Congress Kursaal, Interlaken, Switzerland

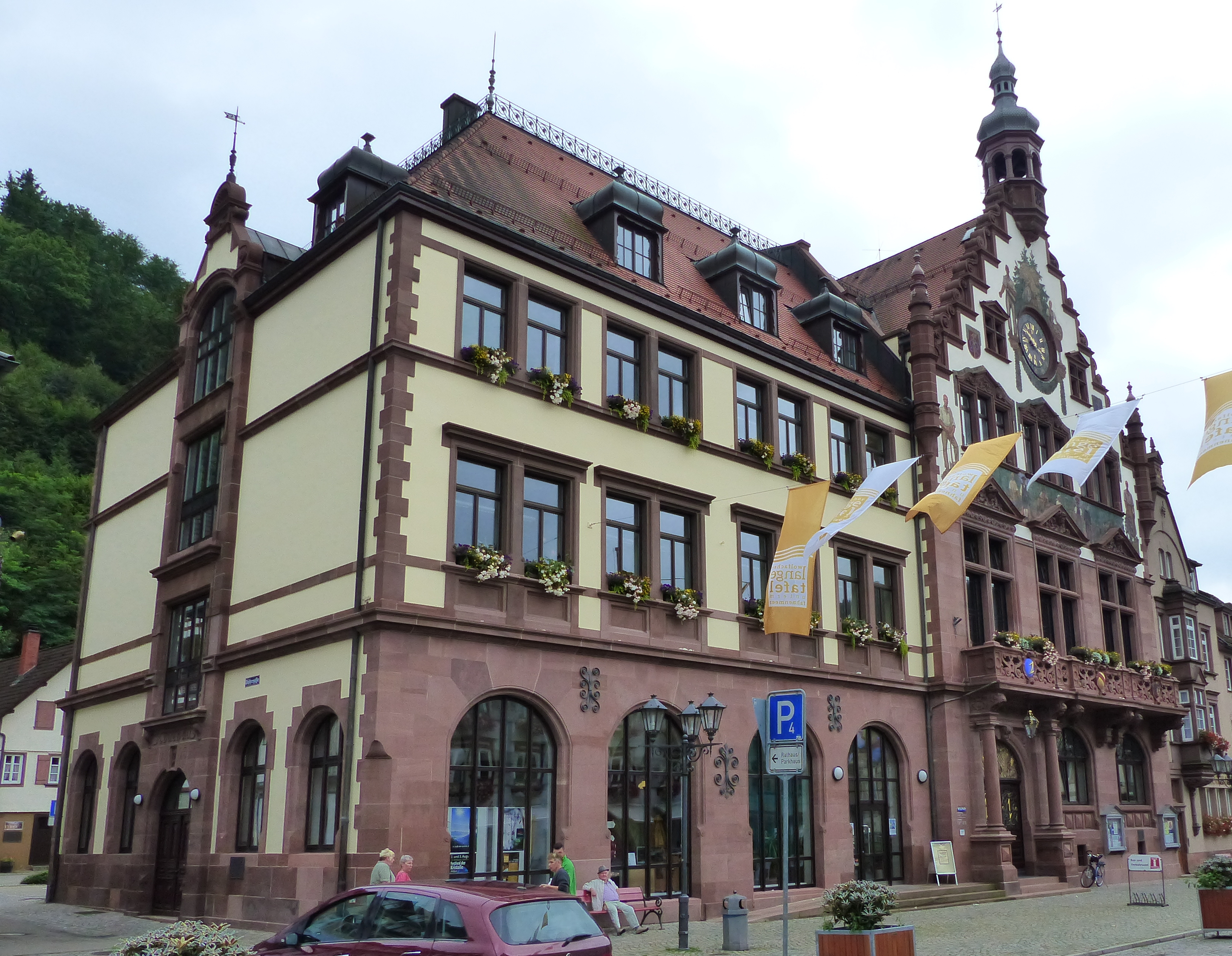
City Hall of Wolfach, Germany

Three Preparatory Congresses collectively served as foundational steps in garnering support, defining objectives, and formulating a comprehensive plan for the World Constitutional Convention. In 1968, 200 delegates representing 27 countries from five continents met for the World Constitutional Convention and Peoples World Parliament at the Theatre Hall of the Congress Kursaal in Interlaken, Switzerland, on August 27, 1968, to draft a constitution for a federal world government. The event commenced on August 27, and on September 2, 1968, sessions moved to Wolfach, Germany, where it concluded on September 12, 1968.

The largest delegations to the Convention and Peoples Parliament comprised representatives from the United States of America, France, India, the United Kingdom, Switzerland, and West Germany. Additionally, participants from Argentina, Belgium, Brazil, Denmark, Canada, Ceylon (Sri Lanka), Colombia, Finland, Ghana, Israel, Italy, Japan, Kenya, Mexico, Netherlands, Nigeria, Norway, Pakistan, Peru, Senegal, and Thailand were in attendance. Delegates from Czechoslovakia and Eastern Europe were unable to partake in the event as soviet Troops suddenly invaded Czechoslovakia. Among the delegates, notable figures such as Abbe Piere, Althya Youngman, Ahmed Jaffer, Elisabeth Mann Borgese, Gonzalo Fernós López, Henri Huber, Kurt Bortner, Martin Niemoller, Max Habicht, Onkar Nath, Oskar Jedzini, Philip Isely, R.K. Nehru, Theo Pontzen and Chief W. J. Falaiye, to name a few, were present.

=== Drafting Commission for the Constitution for the Federation of Earth ===
In Wolfach, Germany, a commission was established to draft a democratic federal world constitution, under the chairmanship of Philip Isely. Isely's commission prepared the "Declaration of Wolfach".

== Emergency Council of World Trustees ==
The World Committee for a World Constitutional Convention (WCWCC), renamed World Constitution and Parliament Association (WCPA), organized an Emergency Council of World Trustees (ECWT) during 1969 and 1971. Philip Isely, secretary of ECWT, in consultation with Thane Read and Lloyd Oxley draw a 'Proposal for Immediate Action' which was adopted in 1971. From December 28, 1971, to January 2, 1972, the Emergency Council convened in Santa Barbara, California, US. The Emergency Council issued several decrees:

- First Decree for the Protection of Life: outlawing of nuclear and biochemical weapons and other weapons of mass destruction.
- Second Decree: assist in convening a peoples world parliament
- Third Decree: to prepare a draft of a Constitution for the Federation of Earth
- Fourth Decree: to appoint and activate planetary legislative commissions on several major problems for the purpose of preparing global legislative measures to have ready for submission to the parliament when it convenes.

The Council terminated deliberations on January 2, 1972, with covering other possible actions covering environmental problems, pressing social and economical issues.

At Santa Barbara, a multitude of dedicated delegates from more than 25 countries gathered, and among them were prominent individuals from India, such as R. K. Nehru, former Secretary-General of the Ministry of External Affairs of India; Godey Murahari, who later became the Speaker of the Rajya Sabha; D. H. Spencer, a renowned constitutional lawyer; and Dr. T. P. Amerasinghe, a Barrister-at-Law from Sri Lanka. Other notable delegates included Reinhart Ruge from Mexico, Dr. Lucile Green from California, US, Mrs. Helen Tucker from Canada, Thane Read from Arizona, US, Archie Casely-Hayford from Ghana, Hon. Syed Mohamed Husain later Judge of the Supreme Court of Bangladesh, Dr. Charles Mercieca from Malta and the US, and Jorgen Laursen Vig from Denmark. Together, a total of 229 representatives from 54 countries joined forces to sign "The First Decree for the Protection of Life".

== Constitution draft ==
=== First draft ===
As in 1968, the World Constitutional Convention and Peoples World Parliament held sessions in Interlaken and Wolfach initiating the task of formulating a constitution. The drafting commission, consisting of D. M. Spencer, an esteemed Constitutional Lawyer and Professor from Sydenham College, Bombay, Hon. Syed Mohammed Husain, an Advocate who later became a Judge of the Supreme Court of Bangladesh, Dr. T. P. Amerasinghe, a Barrister-at-Law and Advocate of the Supreme Court of Sri Lanka, and Philip Isely, the Secretary General of WCPA, joined forces to work on the constitution during January and February 1972. Their efforts were based on Philip Isely's 19-page outline of the draft.

In November 1974, the initial draft titled "A Constitution for the Federation of Earth" was ultimately finished, published and circulated globally by WCPA for assessment, along with the Call to the second session in 1977.

=== Second draft ===
During 1974 and 1975, the WCPA received feedback and comments on the first draft. In 1976, the drafting commission reconvened and finalized a second draft, which was then circulated world-wide for by the WCPA.

== Second World Constituent Assembly ==
Second World Constituent Assembly
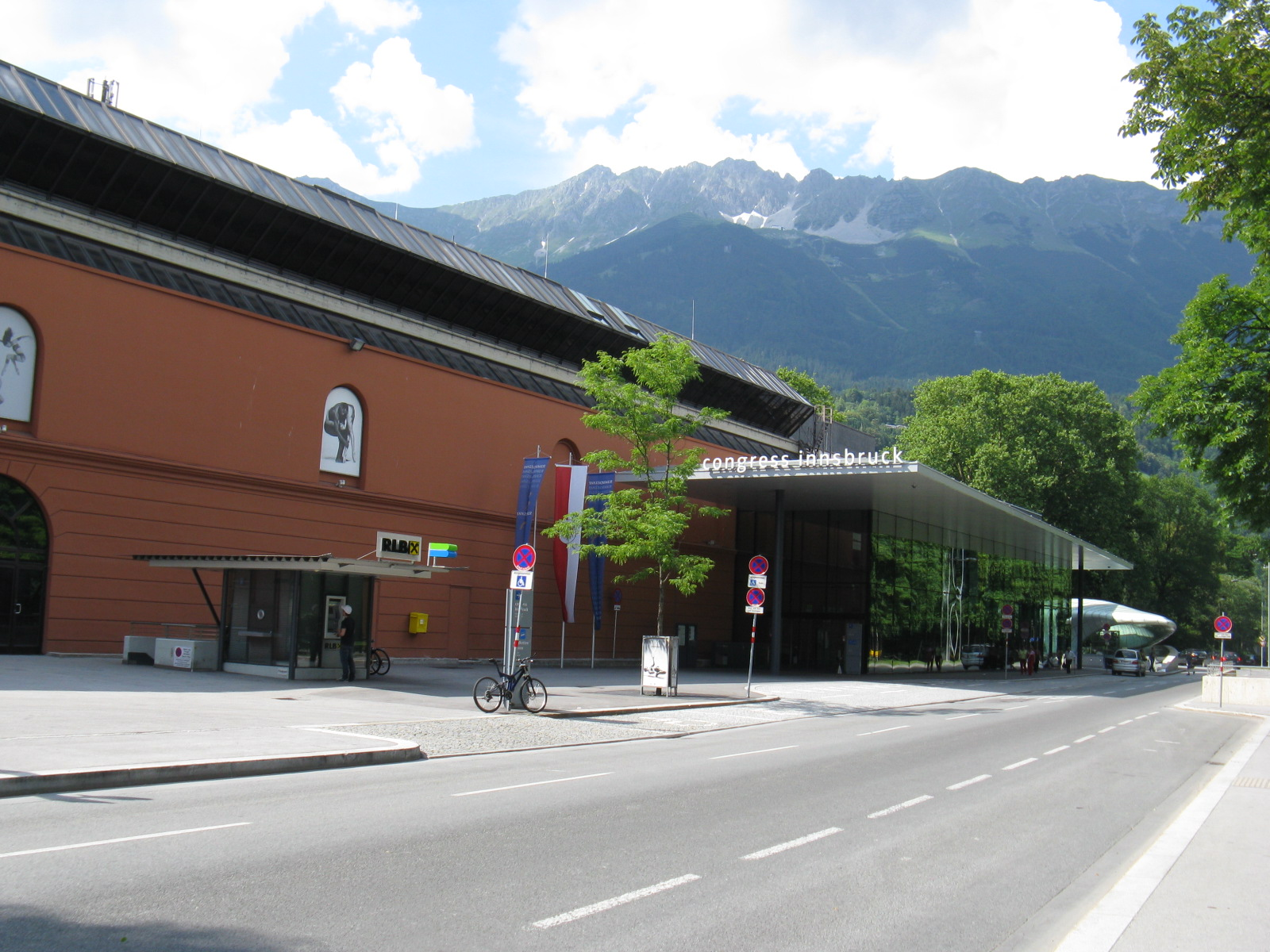
- Kongresshaus, Innsbruck, Austria, venue of the Second World Constituent Assembly
- Date: June 16–29, 1977
- Venue: Kongresshaus, Innsbruck
- Participants: 138
- Outcome: Constitution for the Federation of Earth, Provisional World Government

The second session of the World Constituent Assembly took place in Innsbruck, Austria, from June 16 to June 29, 1977, at Kongresshaus. The assembly was a significant milestone in the pursuit of global governance, as it convened to deliberate and adopt the Constitution for the Federation of Earth. Attended by 138 delegates from 25 countries across six continents, the event marked an unprecedented gathering of international representatives.

During the assembly, the drafting commission presented the proposed 'Constitution for the Federation of Earth', which was then examined clause by clause. The participating delegates engaged in extensive debates, offering amendments and contributing to the refinement of the document. Notable figures leading the discussions included the Indian delegation leader, A. B. Patel, former member of the Kenyan legislature, Dr. S. Kaiser from Netherlands, Dr. Carmel Kussman, New York, Mrs. Mia Lord, London, U.K., Dr. Helen Tucker, Canada, Dr. Hanna Newcombe, Canada, Kenneth Komo, Botswana, Foster Parmalee, U.S.A., Margaret Isely, U.S.A., Dr. Ahmed Subandjo, Indonesia and many more.

=== Adoption and signing ===
The Assembly unanimously adopted the draft constitution on 27 June 1977, signifying a momentous step forward for humanity's quest for a global governance framework. Dr. A. B. Patel described the occasion "as the day of a new age" and called for all those present to come up to the stage and affix their signatures to the Constitution.

== Call for ratification ==
Following the assembly's success, a call for ratification was issued, urging nations and peoples of Earth to endorse the constitution. The WCPA proactively sent copies of the constitution to the United Nations, Members of the General Assembly, and national governments, requesting their support and cooperation in the ratification process.

The call requested:

(a) people of Earth to ratify the Constitution by direct referendum and by an initiative petition followed by election of delegates to the 'House of Peoples';

(b) the national governments and legislatures of the world to ratify the Constitution and elect delegates to the 'House of Nations'; and

(c) the universities, Colleges, Churches, Scientific Academies and Institutes to ratify the Constitution and nominate delegates with a world view as candidates for election to the 'House of Councillors'.

== Further developments ==
Since the Second World Constituent Assembly of 1977, the 'Constitution for the Federation of Earth' has undergone further amendments through two additional sessions of the World Constituent Assemblies in 1978-79 and 1991.

Furthermore, a Provisional World Government with a Provisional World Parliament has been established, holding fifteen sessions of the parliament since 1982, with the last one taking place in 2021.

As of 2023, the developed constitution has been personally ratified by many individuals worldwide, but has not received ratification from any country.

== See also ==
- World Constitution Coordinating Committee
- World Committee for a World Constitutional Convention
- Constitution for the Federation of Earth
- Provisional World Parliament
- World government
- List of constituent assemblies
- Constituent assembly
- Emergency Committee of Atomic Scientists
