= Philip Isely =

American peace activist (1915–2012)

- Born: Henry Philip Isely; October 16, 1915; Montezuma, Kansas, U.S.
- Died: June 26, 2012 (aged 96); United States
- Resting place: Dillon Cemetery, Summit County, Colorado, U. S.
- Education: Antioch College; South Oregon Jr. College
- Occupations: politician; writer; entrepreneur; businessmen
- Years active: 1946–2003
- Title: Founder of World Constitution and Parliament Association (WCPA); Founder of Global Ratification and Elections Network (GREN); Co-Founder of Natural Grocers (formerly Vitamin Cottage)
- Spouses: Margaret Isely (m. 1948; died 1997); Eli Isely (m. 2001)
- Children: 7

Philip Isely (October 16, 1915 – June 26, 2012) was an American peace activist and writer, known for writing numerous books and founding the World Constitution and Parliament Association (WCPA) and the Global Ratification and Elections Network (GREN) along with his wife, Margaret Isely, in 1955.

He was also co-founder of the health-food chain Natural Grocers (formerly Vitamin Cottage store).

== Early life and education ==
Born as Henry Philip Isely on October 16, 1915, the son of James Walter Isely and Jessie M. Owen, he grew up in Montezuma, Kansas.

In 1934–35, he attended South Oregon Jr. College (now Southern Oregon University) in Ashland, Oregon, and from 1935 to 1937, he studied at Antioch College in Yellow Springs, Ohio. In 1939, while pursuing his degree at Antioch College, Isely met Margaret Ann Sheesley and they married in 1948.

== Co-founder of Vitamin Cottage ==
After following an organic diet, Philip's wife Margaret's health improved significantly, they recognized the potential health benefits of natural eating and began distributing nutrition books and taking supplement orders door-to-door, laying the foundation for their business. In 1958, they opened their first health food store in Lakewood, Colorado and in 1963, the Iselys converted a cottage-style house into their new store, inspiring the name change to "Vitamin Cottage". Now, it is run by the second-generation siblings – Zephyr, Kemper and Heather – with more than 160 retail grocery stores in around twenty states of the U.S.

== Political career ==
In 1958, Isely ran as a candidate for the U.S. Congress.

=== Birth of World Constitution and Parliament Association ===
The World Constitution and Parliament Association (WCPA) emerged from the Campaign for World Government (CWG), a movement that gained momentum in the aftermath of World War II. Recognizing the urgent need for a comprehensive constitution to safeguard the planet, Philip and Margaret Isely, prominent advocates based in Denver, Colorado, became key figures in the push for a world parliament and global law.

In the mid-1950s, they joined the CWG at its Chicago offices and, in 1958 alongside individuals like Thane Read, Guy Marchand, and Marie Philips Scot, they formed the "World Committee for a World Constitutional Convention'. In 1961, the committee relocated to Denver and issued (together with World Constitution Coordinating Committee) a public call for the World Constitutional Convention, garnering committed delegates from 50 nations and endorsements from several heads of state.

In 1966, the organization was renamed the World Constitution and Parliament Association (WCPA), with Philip Isely serving as secretary-general and Margaret Isely as treasurer. Notably, their extensive correspondence with influential figures such as Dr. T. P. Amerasinghe of Sri Lanka and Dr. Reinhart Ruge of Mexico contributed to the growth and development of WCPA, eventually leading to their appointment as co-presidents. Together, they dedicated their efforts to advancing the cause of a world constitution in their respective roles for many years.

After Margaret's death in 1997, Isely remarried in 2001, and he left WCPA in 2003, with Glen T. Martin assuming the role of secretary-general.

During their active years, their home was picketed after a local newspaper (Jefferson Sentinel) accused them of being Communists. However, according to Margaret, "One of our neighbors had us investigated because we passed out literature for the Peoples World Parliament, but the FBI gave us a clean slate as harmless pacifists."

== Publications ==
Isely wrote numerous books, including:

=== Books ===
- The People Must Write the Peace, 1950
- A Call to All Peoples and All National Governments of the Earth, 1961
- Outline for the Debate and Drafting of a World Constitution, 1967
- Strategy for Reclaiming Earth for Humanity, 1969
- Call to a World Constituent Assembly, 1974
- Proposal for Immediate Action by an Emergency Council of World Trustees, 1971
- Call to Provisional World Parliament, 1981
- People Who Want Peace Must Take Charge of World Affairs, 1982
- Plan for Emergency Earth Rescue Administration, 1985
- Plan for Earth Finance Credit Corporation, 1987
- Climate Crisis, 1989
- Handbook for Planet Earth, 1993
- Technological Breakthroughs for a Global Energy Network, 1991
- Bill of Particulars: Why the U.N. Must Be Replaced, 1994
- Manifesto for the Inauguration of World Government, 1994
- Call to the Fourth Session of the Provisional World Parliament, 1995
- Critique of the Report of the Commission on Global Governance, 1995

==== Co-writer ====
Philip also co-wrote and edited several works, including "A Constitution for the Federation of Earth" (1974, revised edition 1991) and Plan for Collaboration in World Constituent Assembly for 1991. He was wrote several world-legislation measures adopted at the Provisional World Parliament.

== Death ==
Philip Isely died on June 26, 2012.

== Awards ==
In 1989, obtained a research doctorate in education. He received the Honor Award of the International Association of Educators for World Peace in 1975.

== See also ==
- World Constitution Coordinating Committee
- World Constitutional Convention
- Provisional World Parliament
- World government
- List of American writers
- List of people from Colorado
- List of people from Kansas
- List of peace activists
