= Margaret Isely =

American Businesswomen (1921–1997)

- Born: Margaret Ann Sheesley; August 13, 1921; Orion, Illinois, U.S.
- Died: July 23, 1997 (aged 75); United States
- Resting place: Dillon Cemetery, Summit County, Colorado, US
- Education: Antioch College
- Occupations: entrepreneur; businesswomen; nutritionist; politician
- Years active: 1953–1997
- Title: Founder of Natural Grocers (formerly Vitamin Cottage); Co-founder and Treasurer of World Constitution and Parliament Association
- Spouse: Philip Isely (m. 1948)
- Children: 7

Margaret Isely (August 13, 1921 – July 23, 1997) was an American businesswoman, organic food activist, nutritionist, political activist and peace activist. She is best known for founding the health food chain Natural Grocers in 1955 along with her husband Philip Isely. She was co-founder of the World Constitution and Parliament Association (WCPA) and Global Ratification and Elections Network (GREN) along with her husband Philip Isely.

== Early life ==
Born as Margaret Ann Sheesley, on August 13, 1921, she grew up in Illinois. She worked as a waitress.

In 1946, while pursuing a business degree at Antioch College, Margaret met Henry Philip Isely, who had previously served prison time as a conscientious objector during World War II. They married June 12, 1948.

== Birth of Vitamin Cottage ==
Margaret's journey into the world of nutrition began while working as an "Acting Dietitian" at the Antioch tea room and exploring the writings (the book Let's Get Well) of influential and controversial nutritionist Adelle Davis. Her personal health struggles, including a chronic infection following the birth of her second child, led her to question Western medicine and seek alternative approaches for healing.

Margaret began incorporating an organic diet consisting of fruits, vegetables, naturally raised meat and dairy, and supplements, like fish oil. Embracing this regimen, her health improved significantly. Margaret and her husband, Philip, recognized the potential health benefits of natural eating. They began distributing nutrition books and taking supplement orders door-to-door, laying the foundation for their business. Their dedication and perseverance paid off, and by 1958, they opened their first health food store called the Builder’s Foundation in Lakewood, Colorado. In 1963, the Iselys converted a cottage-style house into their new store, inspiring the name change to Vitamin Cottage.

Now it is run by the second-generation siblings Zephyr, Kemper, and Heather with more than 160 retail grocery stores in around 20 states of US.

== Political career ==
In 1958, Margaret ran for the State Senate as independent for the "Conservation of Life". In that same year, Philip Isely founded the World Constitution and Parliament Association (WCPA), a global organization dedicated to peace, justice, and sustainable development. Margaret was actively involved alongside her husband and played a pivotal role in promoting the WCPA's principles and advocating for a world government that could address global challenges. She served as executive member and treasurer of WCPA. Their home was picketed after a local newspaper, the Jefferson Sentinel, accused them of being communists. "One of our neighbors had us investigated because we passed out literature for the Peoples World Parliament," said Margaret, "but the FBI gave us a clean slate as harmless pacifists."

== Other ==
She has served in many food and industery related organizations:

- President - Natural Foundation for Nutritional Research
- President - Rocky Mountain Nutritional Foods Association
- Executive council member - National Nutritional Foods Association.

She was inducted into the Natural Products Industry Hall of Legends in 2015.

== Death ==
Margaret Isely died on July 23, 1997.

== Legacy ==
The Margaret Ann Isely Foundation was established by her family and friends to fund projects that were important to Margaret. This included the establishment of a nonprofit alternative health clinic in Colorado and a phytoplankton growing project aimed at mitigating global climate change.

== See also ==
- Natural Grocers
- World Constitution and Parliament Association (WCPA)
- World Constitutional Convention
