= Provisional World Parliament =

Transitional international legislative body

Type
- Type: Tricameral
- Houses: House of Peoples; House of Nations; House of Counsellors

History
- Founded: 4 September 1982; 44 years ago

Constitution
- Constitution for the Federation of Earth

The Provisional World Parliament (PWP) is an irregular meeting of activists from around the world, with the aim to establish an actual world parliament. It represents the legislative body of the self-proclaimed "World Government for the Federation of Earth", an initiative of the World Constitution and Parliament Association (WCPA), a non-partisan, 501(c)(3) not-for-profit organization that intends to establish a world federation called Federation of Earth.

It consists of unofficial representatives, delegates and observers from around the world and is tasked with drafting legislation, promoting global cooperation, and facilitating the transition to a more integrated global governance structure. However, no sovereign country is member of the PWP or has ratified the underlying Constitution for the Federation of Earth so far.

Prominent world leaders such as Mohammad Zafrullah Khan, who served as the President of the U.N. General Assembly and Judge and Vice-president of the International Court of Justice, Zail Singh, the chairman of the Non-Aligned Movement (NAM) and President of India, along with Chief Justices from different countries, including Indian Supreme Court Chief Justice K. G. Balakrishnan and Justice P. B. Sawant, as well as Kashefa Hussain, Supreme Court Justice of Bangladesh, have been attendees of PWP's sessions.

== History ==
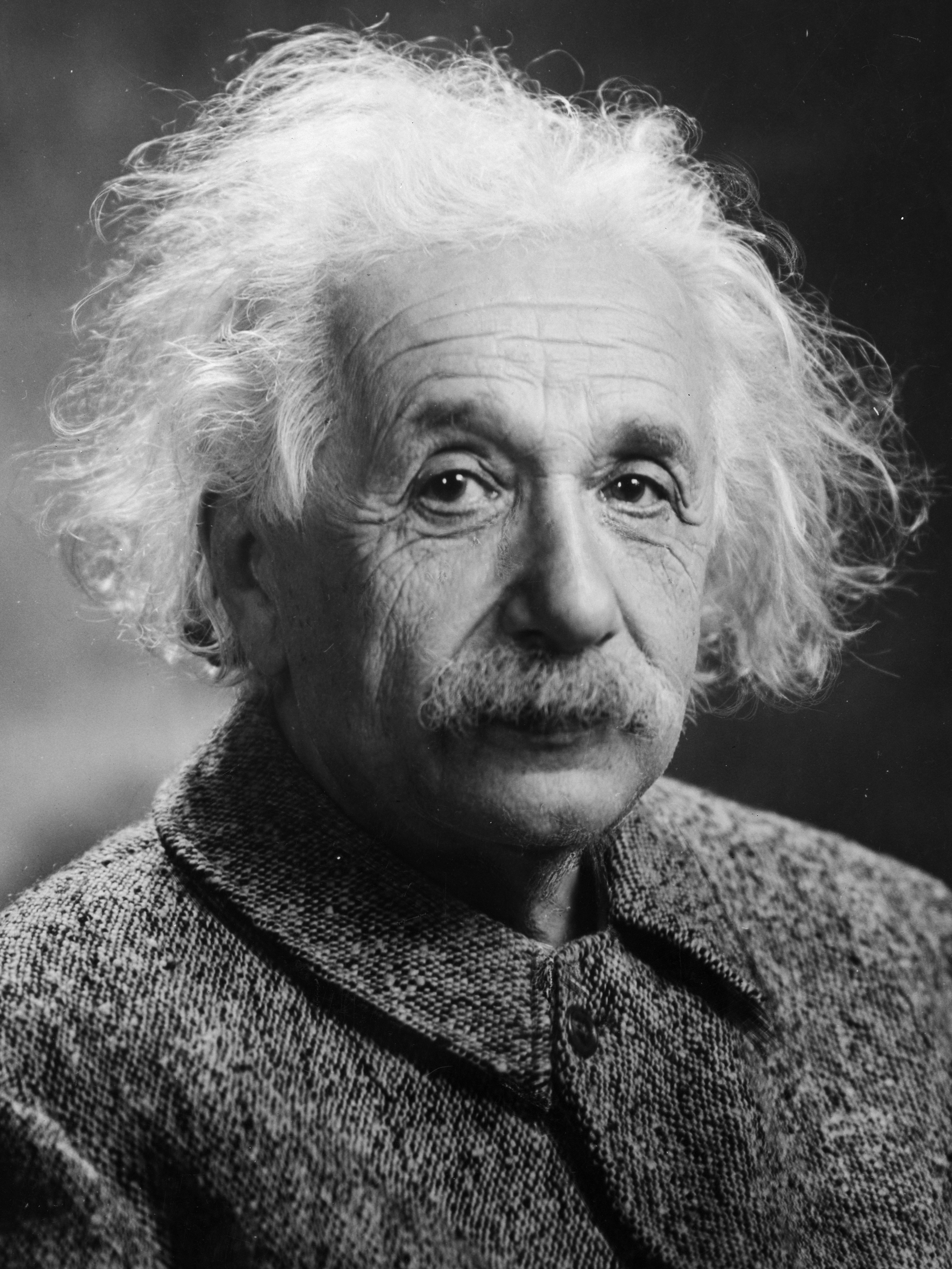
Einstein, 1947 (aged 68)

The origins of the Provisional World Parliament (PWP) can be traced back to the Peoples' World Convention (1950–51) sponsored by Albert Einstein and other prominent figures such as Gerhard Domagk, Robert Hutchins, Kerstin Hesselgren, John Steinbeck, William Beveridge, Hu Shih, Albert Camus, Toyohiko Kagawa, Yehudi Menuhin, Jacques Maritain, John Boyd Orr, Thomas Mann, Sarvepalli Radhakrishnan, Roberto Rossellini and Hans Thirring; and World Constitutional Convention (WCC), also known as the World Constituent Assembly (WCA) or the First World Constituent Assembly, which took place in Interlaken, Switzerland, and Wolfach, Germany, in 1968. Led by Thane Read, an independent U.S. economist and World Constitution Coordinating Committee (WCCC), the convention aimed to establish a global constitution and democratic federal world government to promote global cooperation and world peace. Notable signatories, including Nobel laureates Albert Szent-Györgyi, Bertrand Russell, and leaders like Martin Luther King Jr. and Muhammad Ayub Khan, and thousands more supported the call for the convention.

During the convention, over 200 participants from various countries engaged in the drafting of a constitution for a global federal government. Subsequently, the World Committee for a World Constitutional Convention (WCWCC) (later known as the World Constitution and Parliament Association (WCPA)) continued its efforts, organizing a Second World Constituent Assembly in Innsbruck, Austria, in 1977.

During this second assembly, delegates adopted the "Constitution for the Federation of Earth". Following its adoption, the World Constitution and Parliament Association (WCPA) issued a call for ratification, urging nations and individuals to endorse the constitution. The constitution was sent to various entities, including the United Nations, national governments, and educational institutions, seeking their support and cooperation in the ratification process.

The "Constitution for the Federation of Earth" underwent further amendments through subsequent World Constituent Assemblies in 1978-79 and 1991. Additionally, the Provisional World Parliament (PWP) has convened irregularly since 1982, with its most recent session occurring in 2025.

== List of Provisional World Parliament sessions ==
List of Provisional World Parliament sessions
	Name	Dates	Country	Venue and Location	Notes
1	First Provisional World Parliament	Sept 4, 1982 – Sept 17, 1982	United Kingdom	Royal Pavilion in Brighton, England	Former President of the U.N. General Assembly, Judge and Vice-president of the International Court of Justice and Foreign Minister of Pakistan, Mohammad Zafrullah Khan, inaugurated the session. World Legislative Acts 1 to 5 were deliberated and adopted.
2	Second Provisional World Parliament	March 15, 1985 – March 25, 1985	India	Vigyan Bhawan, New Delhi	The then chairman of the Non-Aligned Movement (NAM) and President of India, Zail Singh, inaugurated the session. World Legislative Acts 6 to 8 were deliberated and adopted.
3	Third Provisional World Parliament	June 18, 1987 – June 28, 1987	United States of America	Fontainbleau Hilton Hotel, Miami Beach, Florida	Session discussed and enacted World Law Bill to Protect Life and Nature on Planet Earth. World Legislative Acts 9 to 11 were deliberated and adopted.
4	Fourth Provisional World Parliament	Sept 14, 1996 – Sept 17, 1996	Spain	Barcelona International Airport, Barcelona	Session approved the Manifesto for beginning world government.
5	Fifth Provisional World Parliament	Nov 22, 2000 – Nov 27, 2000	Malta	Qawra	Session approved the plan to prepare for the next five sessions of the PWP. World Legislative Acts 12 was deliberated and adopted.
6	Sixth Provisional World Parliament	March 24, 2003 – March 27, 2003	Thailand	Bangkok Centre Hotel, Bangkok	Colonel Dr. Somkid Risangkom, Member of Thai Parliament and Representative of the President of the Senate and Associate Professor Yandej Thongsima, Member of Thai Parliament and Chief Advisor to the Prime Minister of Thailand, participated. World Legislative Acts 13 to 18 were deliberated and adopted.
7	Seventh Provisional World Parliament	December 26, 2003 – December 29, 2003	India	Palmgrove Hotel, Chennai	Session was inaugurated by former India Supreme Court Justice P. B. Sawant. World Legislative Acts 19 to 24 were deliberated and adopted.
8	Eighth Provisional World Parliament	Aug 10, 2004 – Aug 14, 2004	India	City Montessori School, Lucknow, Uttar Pradesh	His Honor L. M. Singhvi of the Permanent Court of Arbitration and former Member of Indian lower and upper house inaugurated session. And Mulayam Singh Yadav, Chief Minister of Uttar Pradesh was Chief Guest. World Legislative Acts 25 to 30 were deliberated and adopted.
9	Ninth Provisional World Parliament	April 11, 2006 – April 15, 2006	Libya	Al Kabir Grand Hotel, Tripoli	Suleiman Shahumi, Secretary, Committee for Foreign Liaison, of the Peoples’ National Congress of Libya addressed the session. World Legislative Acts 31 to 38 were deliberated and adopted.
10	Tenth Provisional World Parliament	June 21, 2007 – June 24, 2007	Togo	Palais du Congrès (Congressional Palace), Kara	World Legislative Acts 39 to 42 were deliberated and adopted.
11	Eleventh Provisional World Parliament	July 2, 2009 – July 8, 2009	India	Sri Aurobindo Ashram, Van Niwas, Nainital	World Legislative Acts 43 to 47 were deliberated and adopted.
12	Twelfth Provisional World Parliament	December 27, 2010 – December 31, 2010	India	Bangla Academy and Sri Aurobindo Bhavan, Kolkata	World Legislative Acts 48 to 52 were deliberated and adopted.
13	Thirteenth Provisional World Parliament	December 14, 2013 – December 17, 2013	India	World Unity Convention Centre, CMS, Lucknow	Convened concurrent with 14th session of the International Conference of Chief Justices of the World. World Legislative Acts 53 to 63 were deliberated and adopted.
14	Fourteenth Provisional World Parliament	December 27, 2015 – December 31, 2015	India	Ramakrishna Mission Institute of Culture, Kolkata	World Legislative Acts 64 to 67 were deliberated and adopted.
15	Fifteenth Provisional World Parliament	December 10, 2021 – December 12, 2021	India	United Service Institution, New Delhi and online	Khairat Abdulrazaq-Gwadabe, the Nigerian Senate and Chair of ECOWAS in West Africa, along with former Indian Supreme Court Chief Justice K. G. Balakrishnan and Kashefa Hussain, Supreme Court Justice of Bangladesh, addressed the session. World Legislative Acts 68 to 72 were deliberated and adopted.
16	Sixteenth Provisional World Parliament	December 7, 2025 – December 10, 2025	India	Shenbaga Hotel and Conference Center, Pondicherry, and online	A state of planetary emergency is declared. World Legislative Acts 73 to 91 were deliberated and adopted. A 5th World Constituent Assembly is called.

== World Legislative Acts ==
The World Legislative Acts (WLAs) outlined in the "Constitution for the Federation of Earth" are an essential component of the proposed legislative framework established by the Provisional World Parliament (PWP). These acts serve as the means through which the PWP would exercise its legislative authority and addresses critical global issues. The constitution envisages a comprehensive range of World Legislative Acts that cover various aspects of global governance. Each act is designed to address specific global challenges and advance the principles of the Constitution. However, like the PWP itself, these acts are not recognized internationally, and as such lack binding force over sovereign states.

== Visa issues ==
In 1987, during the third Provisional World Parliament, 100 delegates, primarily from India, Sri Lanka, and various African nations, were denied visas by the United States Department of State under section 214(b) of the federal immigration code.

== See also ==
- World Constitution Coordinating Committee
- World Constitutional Convention
- Constitution for the Federation of Earth
- World government
- International parliament
