= World constitution =

Proposed system of global governance

A world constitution is a proposed framework or document aimed at establishing a system of global governance. It seeks to provide a set of principles, structures, and laws to govern the relationships between states and address global issues. The concept of a world constitution reflects the aspiration for greater international cooperation, peace, and the resolution of global challenges.

== Overview ==
A world constitution serves as a blueprint for organizing and governing global affairs. It typically outlines the powers, functions, and responsibilities of global institutions and establishes mechanisms for decision-making, conflict resolution, and the protection of human rights. The aim is to create a framework that promotes unity, justice, and sustainability on a global scale.

== List of world constitutions ==
Efforts to formulate world constitutions have been present throughout history, often arising in response to global crises or conflicts. These initiatives have sought to address the limitations of the existing international order and propose more comprehensive systems of global governance.

Prominent examples of world constitutions include:

=== Preliminary Draft of a World Constitution (University of Chicago, 1947) ===
The University of Chicago drafted a preliminary document, Preliminary Draft of a World Constitution, outlining a potential world constitution in 1948. Led by Robert Maynard Hutchins, the proposal aimed to stimulate discussions on global governance and provide a basis for further deliberations. The members of the Committee at the time of the publication of the Draft were Robert Hutchins, Elisabeth Mann Borgese, Mortimer J. Adler, Stringfellow Barr, Albert Léon Guérard, Harold Innis, Erich Kahler, Wilber G. Katz, Charles Howard McIlwain, Robert Redfield, and Rexford Tugwell.

=== Constitution for the Federation of Earth (1950s onwards) ===
==== Albert Einstein ====
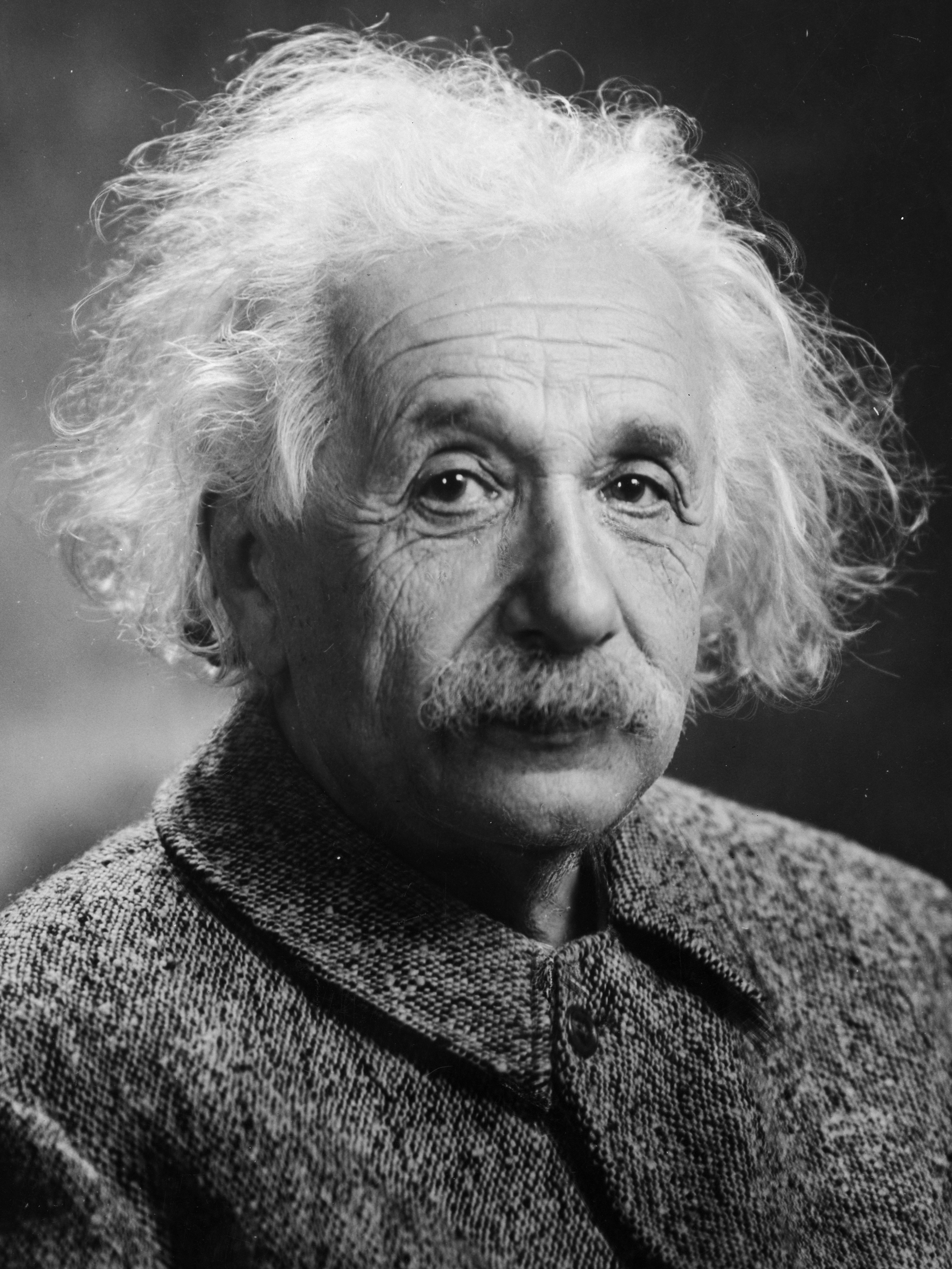
Einstein, 1947 (aged 68)

Albert Einstein grew increasingly convinced that the world was veering off course. He arrived at the conclusion that the gravity of the situation demanded more profound actions and the establishment of a "world government" was the only logical solution. In his "Open Letter to the General Assembly of the United Nations" of October 1947, Einstein emphasized the urgent need for international cooperation and the establishment of a world government. In 1948, Einstein invited United World Federalists (UWF) president Cord Meyer to a meeting of ECAS and joined UWF as a member of the Advisory Board. Einstein and ECAS assisted UEF in fundraising and provided supporting material. Einstein described United World Federalists as: "the group nearest to our aspirations".

Einstein and other prominent figures sponsored the Peoples' World Convention (PWC), which took place in 1950–51 and later continued in the form of world constituent assemblies in 1968, 1977, 1978–79, and 1991. This effort was successful in creating a world constitution and Provisional World Government consisting of a Provisional World Parliament.

==== World constituent assemblies ====
In 1960s the most comprehensive effort was made to draft a world constitution. Thane Read and Philip Isely drafted a form of agreement that aimed to admit delegates from both national governments and the people of all countries for a world constitutional convention. A worldwide call for a World Constitutional Convention was sent, and many world figures and five national governments signed the call. As a result of that, the World Constitutional Convention and the Peoples World Parliament were held in Interlaken, Switzerland, and Wolfach, West Germany, in 1968. Over 200 participants from 27 countries attended these sessions, where the drafting of a constitution for a global federal world government began. The second session of the World Constituent Assembly took place in Innsbruck, Austria, in 1977. After extensive discussions and amendments, the draft constitution was unanimously adopted as the Constitution for the Federation of Earth. It was further amended in the 3rd Constituent Assembly, Colombo, Sri Lanka, 1978–79 and the 4th World Constituent Assembly, Troia, Portugal, in 1991.

==== Provisional World Parliament ====
This Constitution for the Federation of Earth is a framework of a world federalist government. A Provisional World Parliament (PWP), a transitional international legislative body, operates today under the framework of this constitution. It convenes to work on global issues, gathering delegates from different countries.

== See also ==
- United Nations
- Global governance
- World federalism
- World government
- World Constituent Assembly
- Political views of Albert Einstein
