= United Nations Parliamentary Assembly =

Proposed addition to the United Nations System

- In other languages: Arabic: الجمعية البرلمانية للأمم المتحدة; Chinese: 联合国议会大会; French: Assemblée parlementaire des Nations Unies; Russian: Парламентская Ассамблея Организации Объединённых Наций; Spanish: Asamblea Parlamentaria de las Naciones Unidas
- CEUNPA-supported emblem of a UNPA, depicting a hemicycle
- Abbreviation: UNPA
- Type: Proposed Organ of the United Nations
- Legal status: Proposed

The United Nations Parliamentary Assembly (UNPA) is a proposed parliamentary body within the United Nations (UN) system.

The Campaign for a United Nations Parliamentary Assembly (CUNPA) was launched in 2007 by Democracy Without Borders (formerly Committee for a Democratic UN). As of December 2025, the campaign has received the support of over 1,800 members of parliament from 138 countries.

== Timeline ==
=== 1920s ===
Proposals for a parliamentary assembly within global organizations date back to at least the 1920s, when the founders of the League of Nations considered plans to include a people's assembly as part of the League's structure.

=== 1940s ===
In 1945, British politician Ernest Bevin proposed a people's world assembly, saying in the British House of Commons that, "There should be a study of a house directly elected by the people of the world to whom the nations are accountable."

On 16 October 1945, before the UN Charter had entered into force, retired U.S. Supreme Court Justice Owen J. Roberts and former New Hampshire Governor Robert P. Bass held a conference in Dublin, New Hampshire, which passed the Dublin Declaration. It stated that the UN Charter was inadequate to preserve peace and proposed the transformation of the UN General Assembly into a world legislature, suggesting "Such a government should be based upon a constitution under which all peoples and nations will participate upon a basis of balanced representation which will take account of natural and industrial resources and other factors as well as population. It cannot be based on treaties in which the states act and vote as states".

=== 1990s-2000s ===
In the post-Cold War era, several factors contributed to a more favorable environment for UNPA proposals. A Trilateral Commission report notes that the shift from a world led by the two rival Soviet- and U.S.-led blocs meant a general diffusion of power. Growth of economic interdependence, proliferation of transnational actors, nationalism in weak states, spread of technology, and an increasing number of issues (such as global environmental problems and weapons of mass destruction containment) that are both domestic and international have generated a stronger incentive to develop international cooperation than ever before.

In 2003, Freedom House counted 121 electoral democracies, compared to 66 in 1987 and 30 in 1975 (although, by the mid-2000s, the trend appeared to have stagnated).

In early 1993, the House of Commons of Canada Standing Committee on External Affairs and International Trade presented a report stating, "By way of building the public and political constituency for the United Nations, the Committee recommends that Canada support the development of a United Nations Parliamentary Assembly." The Campaign for a Democratic United Nations (CAMDUN), the International Network for a United Nations Second Assembly (INFUSA), and the Global People's Assembly Movement (GPAM), began circulating UNPA proposals around 1995, and other organizations, such as One World Trust, began publishing analyses of how to proceed in the current political situation.

The World Trade Organization and similar organizations prompted concern among some observers as they seemed to be gaining more influence and control over trade disputes, yet were not accountable to the people; U.S. President Bill Clinton argued, "We must insist that international trade organizations be open to public scrutiny instead of mysterious, secret things subject to wild criticism." A "new diplomacy" seemed to be taking shape in which NGOs and governments cooperated to create new global institutions such as the International Criminal Court.

On 8 February 2005, on the initiative of the Committee for a Democratic UN (today Democracy Without Borders), 108 Swiss Parliamentarians signed an open letter to the Secretary-General calling for the establishment of just such a body. On 14 May 2005, the Congress of the Liberal International issued a resolution stating that "the Liberal International calls on the member states of the United Nations to enter into deliberations on the establishment of a Parliamentary Assembly at the United Nations." On 9 June 2005, the European Parliament issued a resolution that contained an item stating that Eurostar "calls for the establishment of a United Nations Parliamentary Assembly (UNPA) within the UN System, which would increase the democratic profile and internal democratic process of the organization and allow world civil society to be directly associated in the decision-making process; states that the Parliamentary Assembly should be vested with genuine rights of information, participation and control, and should be able to adopt recommendations directed at the UN General Assembly; [...]" In 2006, Citizens for a United Nations People's Assembly circulated a petition to UN Secretary-General Kofi Annan to "convene a High Level Panel to determine the steps required for the establishment of a Peoples' Parliamentary Assembly within the United Nations Organization"

In April 2007, international NGOs launched the International Campaign for a United Nations Parliamentary Assembly, the principal current movement for the establishment of a UNPA. Its secretariat is led by Democracy Without Borders. Over 150 civil society groups and nearly 1,500 parliamentarians are part of the Campaign. As of June 2017, thousands of signatories from over 150 countries have endorsed CUNPA's appeal, including parliamentarians, civil society leaders, leading academics, and others such as former UN Secretary-General Boutros Boutros-Ghali, former President of the Pan-African Parliament Gertrude Mongella, actress Emma Thompson, author Sir Arthur C. Clarke, and former NASA astronaut Edgar Mitchell.

On 25 September 2007, the statement by H.E. Mr. José Sócrates, Prime Minister of Portugal, on behalf of the European Union, at the United Nations 62nd Session of the General Assembly, General Debate, stated, "We remain committed to the reform of its main bodies in order to enhance the Organization's representativity, transparency and effectiveness." On 24 October 2007, the Pan African Parliament unanimously adopted a resolution calling for the establishment of a Parliamentary Assembly at the United Nations, noting, "in contrast to regional international bodies such as the African Union, the European Union, the Council of Europe, or Mercosur, the United Nations and its specialized organizations is one of the last international fora lacking an integrated and institutionalized Parliamentary Assembly." So far, four international conferences of CUNPA have taken place.

One of the most influential and well-known pro-UN organizations, UNA-USA, has been on both sides of the issue. In 2003, UNA-USA's executive director of policy studies, Jeffrey Laurenti, wrote an article, "An Idea Whose Time Has Not Come", arguing that there were important unresolved issues of inclusivity, authority, and efficiency with the UNPA. UNA's position seemed to reverse in November 2006, when the 38th plenary session of the World Federation of United Nations Associations issued a resolution stating that it "Supports the establishment of a United Nations parliamentary Assembly as a consultative body within the United Nations system as a voice of the citizens; Calls upon the governments of the United Nations member states, parliamentarians and civil society representatives to jointly examine possible steps and options to create a United Nations Parliamentary Assembly."

Major regional parliaments and parliamentary assemblies
Name	1st session	Direct el.	N.
Parliamentary Assembly of the Council of Europe	1949	N/A	
European Parliament	1952	1979	
Assembly of WEU	1955	N/A	
NATO Parliamentary Assembly	1955	N/A	
Parliamentary Assembly of OSCE	1992	N/A	
Arab Parliament	2001	N/A	
Pan African Parliament	2004	N/A	
Mercosur Parliament	2007	N/A	

The post-World War II years, particularly the 1980s and 1990s, saw tremendous growth in parliamentary assemblies, with more than 40 established since 1949. About 42% of the world's parliamentary assemblies are formally affiliated with an intergovernmental organization; 32% are informally affiliated; and 26% are unaffiliated. The spread in parliamentary assemblies was spurred by acceptance of a parliamentary system as a means of legitimizing decisions; initiatives for intergovernmental cooperation reaching a point at which stronger parliamentary backing was needed; and regional integration. However, many global organizations, such as the UN and WTO, still lack a parliamentary assembly and "have been heavily criticized for what is supposed to be an institutional deficit."

2010s

In February 2010, an international conference of current and former judges from the highest courts of more than 30 countries was held in Lucknow, India. The judges adopted a resolution calling for changes to the United Nations Charter and for the creation of a global parliamentary body that would represent citizens more directly at the international level.

In 2013, the East African Legislative Assembly passed a resolution in support of creating a United Nations Parliamentary Assembly (UNPA). The assembly encouraged the East African Community to take the lead in developing a shared African position on the proposal. Supporters argued that a UNPA could make the United Nations more open, accountable, and effective by giving elected representatives a formal role in its work. The resolution was introduced by Mike Sebalu and supported by several other assembly members.

In a related effort, the Commission on Global Security, Justice and Governance called for the creation of a United Nations Parliamentary Network. The commission was chaired by former United States Secretary of State Madeleine Albright and former Nigerian foreign minister Ibrahim Gambari. It described the proposed network as a way to increase public understanding and involvement in global decision-making by giving national legislators a stronger voice in international institutions. The commission suggested that the network could follow existing models that already link parliamentarians to major global organizations such as the World Bank, the International Monetary Fund, and the World Trade Organization.

In July 2018, the European Parliament adopted a recommendation to the European Council endorsing a proposal for the establishment of UNPA.

=== 2020s ===
Supporters have set forth possible UNPA implementations, including promulgation of a new treaty; creation of a UNPA as a subsidiary body of the UN General Assembly; and evolution of a UNPA from the Inter-Parliamentary Union or another non-governmental organization. Several proposals for apportionment of votes have been raised to address disparities in population and economic power of UN members. CUNPA advocates initially gave the UNPA advisory powers and gradually increased its authority over the UN system.

== Proposals ==
=== Amending the UN Charter ===
Amending the UN Charter, possibly through a Charter it helps Review Conference under Article 109 of the UN Charter, is a commonly cited possibility, including by Louis Sohn and Grenville Clark in their 1958 book World Peace Through World Law. According to Pat Orvis of the Foreign Policy Association, this path is difficult because it requires ratification by two-thirds of UN members, including all five permanent members of the Security Council. There have been only five amendments to the UN Charter since 1945, and none of them were done through the Article 109 process, though one was to Article 109 itself.

=== Establishing the UNPA as a subsidiary body of the UN General Assembly ===
The World Federalist Movement-Canada asserts that the General Assembly has the authority to establish the UNPA as a subsidiary body of the UN General Assembly under Article 22 of the UN Charter. Erskine Childers and Sir Brian Urquhart endorsed this approach in their 1994 book, Renewing the United Nations System. The Committee for a Democratic UN recommended the establishment of UNPA by Article 22 or a transformation of the Inter-Parliamentary Union in its report, Developing International Democracy, authored by Andreas Bummel, co-founder and director of the UNPA campaign. In 2006, the Council of Europe passed a resolution noting, "A decisive step towards the development of a UN parliamentary dimension could be the establishment of an experimental parliamentary committee with consultative functions for General Assembly committees."

=== Non-governmental organization of democratically elected legislators. ===
Parliamentarians for Global Action have suggested a non-governmental organization of democratically elected legislators, which they claimed would have the advantage of not requiring the cooperation of national governments or world parliamentary organizations with dictatorial members, so only democratic legislators, parliaments, and countries would be represented. Dieter Heinrich critiqued this approach by saying, "If it did succeed on any scale, it would divert resources from pressuring governments on thousands of specific issues, which citizens are good at, into the operation of a pan-global institutional structure, which citizens' groups are ill-equipped to do...And the resulting assembly would always be of doubtful legitimacy (who does it represent?) and unlikely value as an evolutionary starting point for a real-world parliament."

=== Stand-alone treaty ===
Andrew Strauss of the One World Trust has put forward establishing a new, stand-alone treaty, which he claims would require as few as 20 or 30 economically and geographically diverse countries to establish a UNPA, which could expand as more countries ratified the treaty. Strauss notes that this is the method by which most international bodies, such as the World Health Organization, International Labour Organization, and International Criminal Court, were founded. José Enrique Alvarez, Professor of International Law at New York University School of Law, suggests this route would begin via a conference of plenipotentiaries to draft the treaty, which would then need to be ratified by each country.

=== Use and/or transform the Inter-Parliamentary Union ===
The Inter-Parliamentary Union (IPU) is a body that was granted observer status in 2002. The IPU's Second World Conference of Speakers of Parliament adopted a resolution stating, "We would greatly welcome more substantive interaction and coordination with the United Nations, and call upon the world body to resort more frequently to the political and technical expertise which the IPU, together with its Member Parliaments, can provide." Moreover, a 2005 article by IPU Secretary-General Anders B. Johnsson stated that, "It makes little practical or political sense to set up a separate parliamentary assembly alongside the existing governmental General Assembly." The Inter-Parliamentary Union has sometimes supported a reestablished IPU as a substitute for a UNPA, saying, "The Union had the necessary experience, and further bureaucracy should be avoided." Many national parliaments, however, are currently not members of the IPU.

== Powers ==
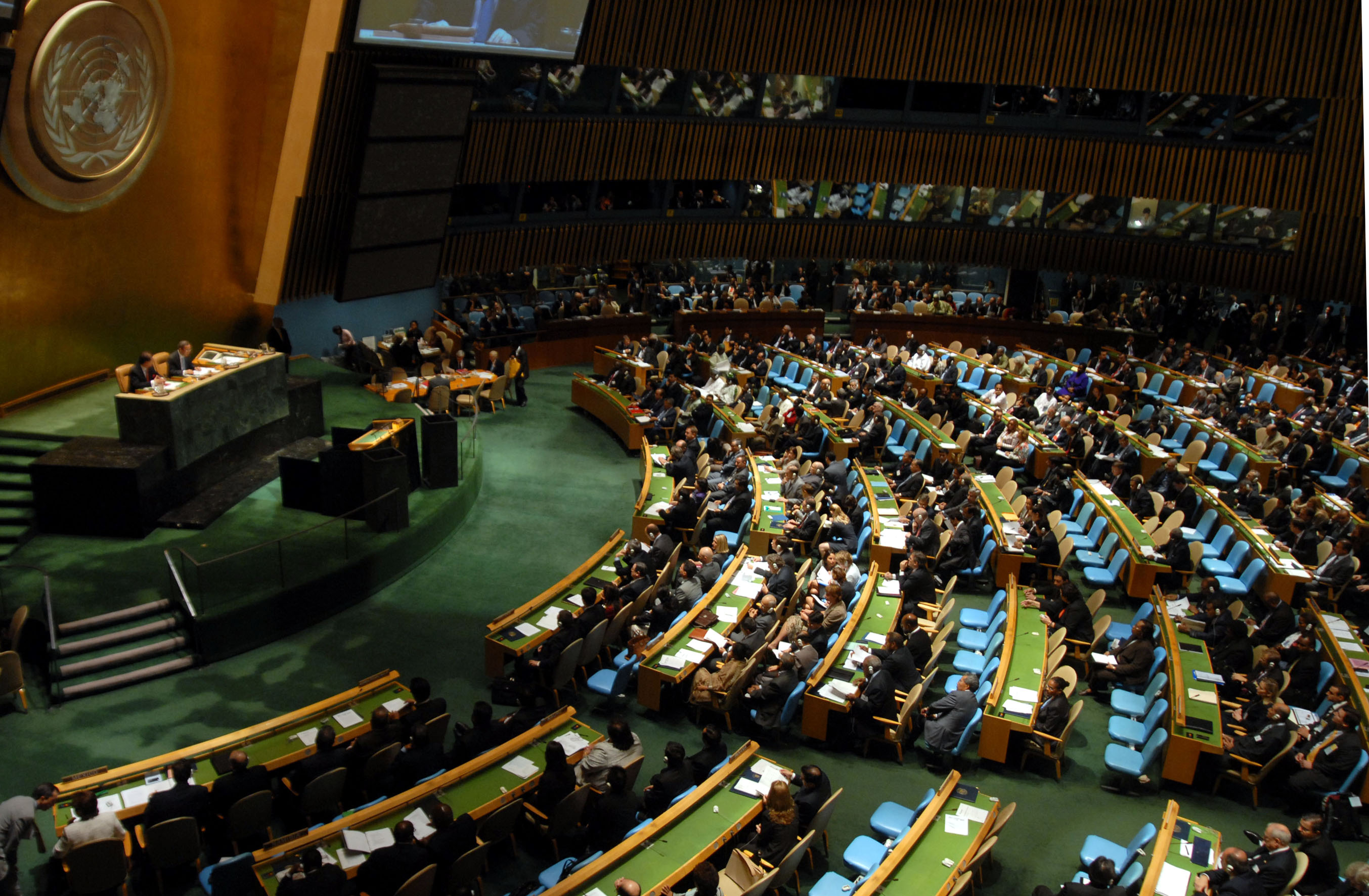
Following the example of many national parliaments, the UN General Assembly would likely function at first as the unelected upper house of a bicameral UN system.

The CUNPA proposes that the UNPA begin as a consultative body whose powers could be augmented as it evolved into a directly elected assembly: "Step by step, it should be provided with genuine rights of information, participation and control vis-à-vis the UN and the organizations of the UN system." An article in the Asian-Pacific Law & Policy Journal notes that precedents for this idea include the British Parliament, French Estates-General, U.S. Congress, and the European Parliament, which are all systems in which, over time, power shifted to directly elected officials: "In the past, fledgling democracy has always had to compromise with the realities of power and evolve step-by-step, where possible.

This is often accomplished in the form of a 'non-democratic' additional house in the parliamentary structure. Thus, in Britain, the necessity of compromise of the 'common people' with the powers and interests of the armed and titled nobility necessitated a bicameral system incorporating the House of Lords, as well as the House of Commons. The French Estates-General included similar power blocs as 'estates' or functional separate houses, and the United States Senate reflected a necessary compromise of the interests of less populous states, hesitant to subject themselves to 'democratic inundation' by the more populous states."

World federalists often point out that a democratic union of peoples, rather than governments, is suggested by the opening words of the Preamble to the United Nations Charter, "We the peoples ..." This sentiment was expressed by Theo van Boven, who said, "A more democratic United Nations as envisaged by the campaign for a UN Parliament will strengthen the legitimacy of We the peoples of the United Nations in whose name the UN Charter was proclaimed." According to the Committee for a Democratic UN, "The UNPA concept is the first step towards a democratic world parliament". World federalists typically view an empowered democratic assembly as a means of preventing war by providing everyone a peaceful means of pursuing their political objectives. Walter Cronkite, for instance, said, "Within the next few years, we must change the basic structure of our global community from the present anarchic system of war and ever more destructive weaponry to a new system governed by a democratic UN federation."

However, there is some opposition to the idea of an empowered global parliament. A 2007 BBC poll of approximately 12,000 respondents asked, "How likely would you be to support a Global Parliament, where votes are based on country population sizes, and the global parliament is able to make binding policies?" Of those polled, 19.1% responded "Very unlikely–it is a bad idea"; 14.9% responded "Quite unlikely–but it might work"; 23.1% said "Quite likely–but with reservations"; and 14.4% said "Very likely–it is a good idea". The poll was broken out by country, and the U.S. and Australia showed the strongest opposition. Potential challenges to the UNPA are political organizations such as the U.S. Constitution Party and politicians such as 2008 U.S. presidential candidate Ron Paul, who favor withdrawal from the United Nations and other multilateral organizations altogether due to sovereignty concerns. Canadian Action Party leader Connie Fogal also opposes the UNPA, saying, "It is very revealing to see the NDP and the Greens as part of and promoting this...Further, the European assembly has proven to be a rubber-stamping mechanism of bureaucratic decisions. This is not democracy." In addition, a Civicus article warns, "With an unexpected backlash against civil society in the offing (despite the good efforts of the UN General Assembly President, Jan Eliasson, to reverse the trend), citizen participation at the UN is diminishing quickly. It would be safe to assume that Member States as a whole are not in the mood to consider a Parliamentary Assembly at this time."

Herbert W. Briggs points out that while a UNPA could be established as a UNGA subsidiary body without any changes to international law, granting it the power to pass binding legislation would require a UN Charter amendment or a new treaty. The UNGA plays a role in admitting, suspending, and expelling UN members, approving the budget, and electing members to other UN bodies, but its powers as outlined in Chapter IV of the UN Charter are mostly advisory in nature. These include the power to "discuss," "make recommendations," "consider," "call the attention of the Security Council to situations," "initiate studies," "receive...reports," etc., as well as "establish such subsidiary organs as it deems necessary for the performance of its functions." The Charter contains no provision allowing the UNGA to delegate any powers it does not itself possess. And while Article 25 states, "The Members of the United Nations agree to accept and carry out the decisions of the Security Council," there is no requirement that members abide by the recommendations of the UNGA. On the other hand, Article 13(1)(a) of the Charter tasks the UNGA with "encouraging the progressive development of international law and its codification."

According to Oscar Schachter, there is some question as to whether the traditional international lawmaking process of state-by-state treaty ratification is adequate today: "The traditional case-by-case process of customary law cannot meet the necessity for common action to deal with the numerous problems raised by technological developments, demographic and environmental impacts, changing attitudes as to social justice, or the many requirements of international business. While multilateral treaties can deal with all of these matters, the treaty processes are often complicated and slow, whereas UN resolutions can be more readily attained." The Law of the Sea is an example of an agreement that has been ratified by the majority of the world's countries for decades and still has not been passed in the U.S. (although the Cato Institute views the delay as a good thing). George Monbiot argues, "The absence of an international legislature undermines the authority of an international judiciary (such as the proposed criminal court). Judges presiding over the war-crimes tribunals at the Hague and in Arusha have been forced, in effect, to make up the law as they go along."

Proposals to give the UNGA legislative power–including the "binding triad" idea, which would have made UNGA resolutions binding if passed by countries constituting a supermajority of the world's states, population, and economic production–have made little headway. According to Heinrich, once the UNPA is established, it will be easier to gather support for empowering it. The assembly's own members can be expected to play a major role in pushing for its evolution by seeking a UN Charter amendment to make it a "principal organ" in parallel with the General Assembly. With their political know-how, their access to the highest levels of their national governments, and their credibility with the world public and the media, the politicians in the UN Parliamentary Assembly can be expected to become a strong and persistent political force for organizing the assembly's eventual transformation.

== Legitimacy and accountability ==
Proponents claim that one of the primary purposes of creating a UNPA is to enhance UN accountability and legitimacy. The United Nations System spent more than $1.8 billion of public money in 2005, and its own auditors have pointed out that it lacks adequate internal controls to protect against waste, fraud, and mismanagement. Strauss asserts that by holding hearings, issuing reports, and passing resolutions, the UNPA could exercise oversight over other UN bodies. In a September 2007 press release, MEP Graham Watson expressed his hope that "in an era where the UN's mandate has grown exponentially, the UNPA would act as a watchdog on its activities, monitoring its decision-making deadlines, its accountability and transparency". London Mayor Ken Livingstone promised that, "a more democratic United Nations as envisaged by this campaign will strengthen the accountability and legitimacy of the UN." The Pan African Parliament's resolution mirrored this sentiment: "If democratization is a major means to legitimize and improve national governance, it is also the most reliable way to legitimize and improve international organizations, making it more open and responsive by increasing participation."

Former Canadian Senator Douglas Roche, O.C., argues in his book The Case for a United Nations Parliamentary Assembly that an indirectly elected UNPA consisting of delegates appointed by national parliaments creates additional checks and balances by providing oversight by a parliamentary body that would be independent of member nations' executive branches. It would open up the global policymaking process to a larger group of elected officials by shifting some power from the relatively small executive branches of countries to the larger legislative branches. According to Roche, globalization has tended to increase the power of the executive branch while marginalizing the legislative branch; for instance, U.S. Presidents since George H. W. Bush have been given fast-track authority to negotiate trade agreements, subject to a "yea or nay" scrutiny by the U.S. Congress on the negotiated deal.

A Property and Environment Research Center report argues that changes in the Organization for Economic Co-operation and Development are another example of how international regulation removes checks and balances between the branches of government: "The OECD was created by a 1961 treaty, ratified by the U.S. Senate, to help achieve economic growth. In April 1998, a ministerial meeting reinterpreted the treaty, adding social and environmental considerations to the economic ones. The United States executive branch agreed to the changes, but the Senate had no opportunity to debate this treaty, even though it differed significantly from the 1961 treaty. The executive branch had essentially negotiated a new deal without Senate approval." World Federalist Canada Briefing Paper No. 30, however, suggests that UNPA proposals may spark opposition from the executive branches that stand to lose power: "Experience has shown that civil servants and diplomats working in national foreign ministries are less likely to support or see the need for a UNPA. They view the UN as a forum for discussion among sovereign states; whatever action the UN takes is a result of bargaining and compromise among member states".

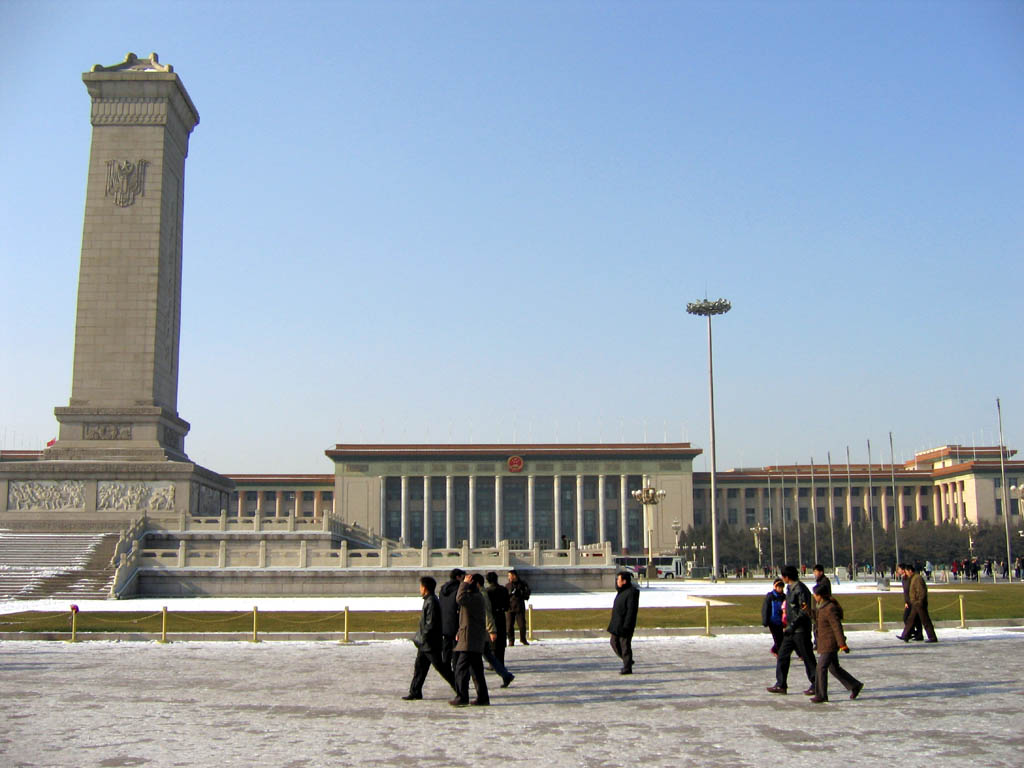
The composition of the Chinese National People's Congress (seated at the Great Hall of the People, as shown here) is controlled by the ruling Chinese Communist Party.

A significant practical obstacle to a completely democratically elected and representative UNPA is that, in contrast to the situation in which the European Parliament functions, a significant number of UN members, including populous countries such as China, are not electoral democracies. In the past, bodies such as the United Nations Commission on Human Rights were criticized for being dominated by abusive regimes. If UNPA representatives were to be drawn from member nations' parliaments, it could create legitimacy concerns since some national legislatures are regarded as a rubber stamp for the rulers' decrees.

Some global parliament proponents, such as Prof. Lucio Levi, propose starting a federation limited to democracies: "Though the democratization of states all over the world hasn’t been completed, this does not preclude starting the democratization of the UN. Six Western European countries founded the European Community, starting its democratization without waiting for the democratization of the institutions of all the European states." UNA-USA's Jeff Laurenti notes the problems associated with excluding undemocratic countries from membership: "It is one thing to deny membership to a few small 'rogue' dictatorships. It is quite another to exclude China, the vast majority of Arab countries, and two-thirds of Africa, and imagine that the resulting body can have a formal consultative or oversight role with United Nations agencies, be part of UN-sponsored negotiations on multilateral conventions (the real work of international legislating), or pass on the resolutions of UN political bodies."

UNPA proponents frequently counter by pointing out that most of the world's countries are democratic.

== Funding ==
Heinrich argues, "It is essential that the salary and travel costs of UN parliamentarians should be paid by the institution of the UN Parliamentary Assembly from its own budget (which would be part of the UN budget), and not by the national governments individually. This is both to assure the independence of the UNPA politicians in their service to the UN and to assure equality of participation." Article 17 of the UN Charter stipulates, "The expenses of the Organization shall be borne by the Members as apportioned by the General Assembly." Thus, unless funded by private donors (as the land for UN headquarters was in 1946), presumably the UNPA would be funded like the rest of the UN system, with larger economies such as the U.S. paying larger shares of the contributions. This disparity might be offset by weighting members' votes according to their gross national product or their contributions to the UN system. A Vancouver Sun article notes, "Another point of opposition would involve the notion of adding bureaucracy and complexity to the UN. The estimated cost of the new outfit runs $140 million to $280 million a year."

A 1993 Parliamentarians for Global Action survey showed that a substantial majority of parliamentary respondents thought that the public would support the idea of a UN Parliamentary Assembly. Still, they were less sure the public would be prepared to finance it. The analysis pointed out, "The possibility of a greater financial burden to support an enlarged UN is unlikely to evoke support unless it can be demonstrated that the return on investment is significant. Citizens are often known to express lofty globalist sentiments when questioned on general principles, and to surrender them when costs or trade offs are concerned." A 1995 United Nations University report claimed, "it is difficult to see how the Parliamentary Assembly would be able to pay for the salaries and travel of what could be over 1,000 representatives; this proposal could increase the duplication and waste that already exist within multilateral bodies."

== Direct election vs. appointment by national parliaments ==
A UNPA might begin as an inter-parliamentary institution–an assembly of parliamentarians from their respective countries' legislatures–and then change to a directly elected body. This would be similar to the evolution of the European Parliament. Beginning with the European Common Assembly's founding in 1952, MEPs were appointed by each of the Member States' national parliaments; in 1979, direct election was instituted. Canadian diplomat and politician Douglas Roche, in his book The Case for a United Nations Parliamentary Assembly, analyses the tradeoffs between the two choices. Roche explains that a UNPA based on existing parliamentarians may be easier to establish, because it avoids several hurdles, such as decisions on electoral cycles, a universally acceptable electoral body, legitimacy of elections, and so on: "A body comprising national parliamentarians has the 'stamp of approval' built-in. National parliamentarians can claim electoral legitimacy in their own right. Admittedly, the credibility of domestic franchising can be called into question, but the trend toward democracy has been strengthening rapidly."

National parliamentarians also usually have staff and money, which could ease the funding issues associated with forming a new world parliamentary assembly. Delegates to a directly elected UNPA, on the other hand, would have more time to devote to the global assembly, since its members would not be occupied with duties relating to their membership in their national legislature. Heinrich points out strategic advantages of an indirectly elected UNPA: "Another advantage to basing representation in a UN Parliamentary Assembly on national parliaments is that it may engage parliamentarians as allies in the cause of getting the assembly established, and, later, helping to build the political will for its evolution. The experience of being a UN parliamentarian will galvanize many of these politicians into going home as advocates for the UN, including the need for strengthening and democratizing the UN Parliamentary Assembly itself."

Heinrich also notes the possibility that national parliaments could appoint citizen representatives to the UNPA, similar to how the U.S. Electoral College officially selects the president. This would be a stopgap solution until direct election became possible. Yet it would still ensure that citizens would be electing citizens (albeit indirectly), rather than the executive appointing officials, to the UNPA.

== Apportionment of votes ==
System	Brazil	Indon.	U.S.	India	China
Schwartzberg's weighted voting	1.91%	1.38%	9.07%	5.96%	7.67%
Provisional People's Assembly method	2.22%	(Note: Due to "Partially free" status.)1.71%	6.15%	5.64%	(Note: Due to "Not free" status.)3.25%
One person, one vote	2.78%	3.50%	4.36%	17.35%	18.58%
Penrose method	1.84%	2.05%	2.34%	4.60%	4.89%
Weighting by nominal GDP	3.04%	1.15%	22.45%	2.65%	13.40%
One state, one vote	0.52%	0.52%	0.52%	0.52%	0.52%

Proportion of the total vote allocated to 5 countries under different voting systems

A global parliamentary assembly could be structured to give populous states greater influence. The one state, one vote rule of the UN General Assembly gives small states a disproportionate amount of influence over the UN system in respect to their population. In Entitlement quotients as a vehicle for United Nations reform, University of Minnesota professor emeritus Joseph E. Schwartzberg notes, "The sixty-four least populous members–enough to block a two-thirds majority vote–comprise less than one percent of the world's total population, and in theory, the 127 least populous members, accounting for barely eight percent of humanity, are enough to provide the two-thirds majority needed to pass a substantive resolution." He continues this point in his essay, Overcoming Practical Difficulties in Creating a World Parliamentary Assembly:

[...] the disparities in populations among members of the UN are so much greater than those of units represented in any national legislature as to make a second house analogous to the U.S. Senate an impractical recommendation. To comprehend this point, note that California, the most populous state in the United States, has 69 times the population of Wyoming the least populous state, whereas [the People's Republic of China], the most populous member of the UN, has more than 100,000 times the population of Nauru or Tuvalu, the two least populous members (each with barely more 10,000 inhabitants). While California has 52 seats in the House of Representatives, compared to Wyoming’s one, both have two seats in the Senate. But who would argue that Nauru should have as much power ... as China?

There are several alternate proposals for the apportionment of votes among member nations:

Schwartzberg's weighted voting formula takes into account population (the democratic/demographic principle), contribution to the UN budget (the economic principle), and share of the total membership. The idea of weighting countries' votes according to their financial contribution to the organization is not unprecedented, as the World Bank, International Monetary Fund, and other Bretton Woods institutions use this method.

The Provisional People's Assembly's methodology gives each nation Population Seats based on a calculation that combines the Penrose method, which takes the square root of the millions of inhabitants of each country, Economic Seats equal to its portion of the world's total gross domestic product, and classification as Free, Partially Free, or Unfree by Freedom House.

Under one person, one vote, each country's number of votes is directly proportional to its population. This would be similar to how U.S. states are represented in the United States House of Representatives. In The Future of Sovereignty – Rethinking a Key Concept of International Relations, Hasenclever et al. sum up the advantages and disadvantages of this system: "In a strict meaning of democracy based on individuals as subjects, every person's vote would have to have the same weight. However, none of the known proposals supports such a strict interpretation, because the inequality among the states' voting powers would be extreme with only four countries [sic] – China, India, the United States, and the former USSR – disposing of an absolute majority."

== Election standards ==
A directly elected UNPA might have common election standards similar to the European Parliament. The European Parliament has adopted certain minimum requirements, such as proportional representation, that each member country must abide by to be represented. Schwartzberg proposes a professional election commission "to ensure that assembly elections are carried out, to the maximum extent, on a level playing field". Under Schwartzberg's proposal, the commission would have several powers, including the authority to establish rules of fairness, determine in advance whether fairness criteria were being met, and foreclose polling where those criteria were not met. He proposes criteria that an election must meet to be considered valid, such as minimum participation rates that initially could be set as low as 20%, and gradually increased.

== See also ==
- Community of Democracies
- Global citizenship
- Global governance
- Cosmopolitan democracy
- Supranational union
- List of countries by population
- List of indices of freedom
- Reform of the United Nations
- Seats-to-votes ratio
- World Federalism
- World Constitution and Parliament Association (WCPA)
- World Federalist Movement/Institute for Global Policy
- High-Level Week of the 80th Session of the United Nations General Assembly 2025
