= Campaign for the Establishment of a United Nations Parliamentary Assembly =

Political group supporting major UN reform

Campaign for a United Nations Parliamentary Assembly (CUNPA)
- The official logo of the CEUNPA
- Formation: April 2007
- Legal status: Global network
- Purpose: Political advocacy
- Region served: Global
- Main organ: Steering Committee (informal)
- Parent organization: Democracy Without Borders
- Affiliations: Democracy Without Borders; Society for Threatened Peoples International; World Federalist Movement-IGP; Democracia Global; The Workable World Trust
- Website: unpacampaign.org

The Campaign for a United Nations Parliamentary Assembly (CUNPA) is a global network of more than 300 non-governmental organizations (NGOs) and 1,800 current and former parliamentarians from around 150 countries devoted to establishing a United Nations Parliamentary Assembly.

== Campaign objectives ==
CUNPA-supported symbol of a UNPA, reflecting parliamentary benches and recalling the Flag of the United Nations

The Campaign's objectives:

- To make the UNPA proposal visible in political debates and the media
- To facilitate the creation of national and local networks of individuals, non-governmental organizations and parliamentarians advocating a UNPA in their sphere of influence
- To establish a global multi-stakeholder coalition which unites parliamentary and civil society efforts for a U.N. Parliamentary Assembly
- To facilitate contacts and debates with potentially like-minded parliaments and governments

== Profile ==
=== Steering committee ===
The Campaign's Secretariat is led by Democracy Without Borders. The work of the Campaign is guided by an informal Steering Committee, which helps to define the Campaign's goals, policies and strategies. The Steering Committee consists of the NGOs Democracy Without Borders, Society for Threatened Peoples International, World Federalist Movement-IGP, Democracia Global, and The Workable World Trust.

=== Regional and national networks ===
The Campaign for a United Nations Parliamentary Assembly has built coalitions and established national and regional networks all over the world—for example—in Israel, Germany, Argentina, Sweden, Canada and Spain, among others. Multiple Global Weeks of Action for a World Parliament have also been held, with supporting activities taking place across the world.

== History ==
The policy of the Campaign is based on the "Appeal for the Establishment of a Parliamentary Assembly at the United Nations" which was presented at launch events in over ten countries during April and May 2007. 552 persons were initial signatories to the petition, among them parliamentarians and individuals such as Nobel Prize laureates, Right Livelihood Award laureates, civil society leaders, three former prime ministers, several former foreign ministers and Boutros Boutros-Ghali, a former UN Secretary General. At a meeting in November 2007, the Campaign reiterated its policy as formulated in the appeal.

Although the CUNPA's early literature seemed to emphasize indirect election of the UNPA as a necessary first step, in November 2007, the organization noted that some countries could choose direct election of delegates in the first stage of the body's existence. Similarly, early CUNPA statements stressed the UNPA's oversight role over the UN and its bodies, but the November 2007 statement clarified that the UNPA could also have a role overseeing the Bretton Woods institutions. In a statement on the financial crisis issued in April 2008 this position was confirmed and outlined in more detail.

In 2016, the Campaign received strong support from the Pan-African Parliament, and in 2017 the Campaign's chairman, Andreas Bummel, was invited to give a statement to the Parliament.

As of 2018, the campaign claimed the support of 1535 former and current members of parliament around the world, as well as the support of some other academic and public figures. Support has also come from some national political parties, inter-governmental organizations governmental bodies, and non-governmental organizations. The Campaign has also been discussed in motions at the German, Icelandic, Canadian, Mercosur and European parliaments, among others. Support for the Campaign has been diverse in nature, coming from both ends of the political spectrum.

== See also ==
- United Nations Parliamentary Assembly
- Democracy Without Borders
- Reform of the United Nations
- Cosmopolitan democracy
