= Transnational progressivism =

21st-century perceived ideological trend

Transnational progressivism is an umbrella term coined by American conservative writer John Fonte in his 2011 book Sovereignty or Submission: Will Americans Rule Themselves or Be Ruled by Others? to describe a broad movement that he claims seeks to transfer political power away from elected bodies in sovereign states and towards courts, bureaucracies, non-governmental organizations (NGOs) and various other largely unelected transnational bodies. He describes it as a global movement calling for change in institutional values so that "the distinct worldviews of ethnic, gender, and linguistic minorities" are represented within dominant social and political institutions. This term is mainly used by Fonte and other "new sovereigntists" claiming that Western ways of life are dependent on national sovereignty and therefore are undermined by "globalists" in academia and in international humanitarian and environmental NGOs. To Fonte, global governance—with its increasing role through international organizations such as the International Court of Justice—threatens to usurp American exceptionalism and to weaken the role of the US Constitution and democracy.

Fonte's use of the phrase is not to be confused with its use by academics in the 2008 edited book Britain and Transnational Progressivism, where, for example, historian Ian Tyrrell refers to the United States' Progressive Era from 1896 to 1917 during which "transatlantic progressivism" thrived, in the form of the women's temperance and suffrage movements.

== Definition in right-wing discourse ==
Fonte describes what he considers to be key concepts of the movement, its ideals and key figures within it. Citing numerous NGOs that were calling for minority rights, Fonte claims that international organizations—unable to enact civil rights reform through typical legal processes within restrictive local establishments and nation-states that may be hostile to their views—had turned to global institutions to achieve their goals. He states that these seemingly disparate bodies—such as the European Union, the United Nations and numerous NGOs (including cultural, human rights & environmentalist groups)—had a shared "agenda" pushing towards cosmopolitan global citizenship that might pit the concerns of identity groups against the rights of individuals.

Fonte views humanitarian organizations as a threat to American democracy, claiming they privilege race and gender "categories and divisions" in their vision of humanity. He concludes that NGOs had a "common ideology" that he called "transnational progressivism" and devised a definition for it in an essay in 2002. He posits that the forces of "post-Western" and "post-democratic" transnational progressivism are competing against the traditional "nation-centered" liberal democracy—which includes "individual rights, democratic representation (with some form of majority rule) and national citizenship". This adds a fourth component to politically divisive forces—along with traditional realpolitik that pitted nation-state against nation-state, the clash of civilizations, (Note: American political scientist Samuel P. Huntington, who like Fonte, had been associated with the American Enterprise Institute think tank, had first presented the "Clash of Civilizations" theory in a 1992 lecture at the AEI. Huntington said that in a post-Cold War period, future wars would take place over differences in cultural and religious identities. In response to The End of History and the Last Man by Francis Fukuyama, who was his former student, Huntington published his 1993 article in Foreign Affairs. —"The Clash of Civilizations?". Foreign Affairs. Summer 1993.) and democratic versus undemocratic systems. On the one hand are those who adopt a "collectivist continental European approach" and on the other an "entrepreneurial, liberal, Anglo-American style regime".

He lists nine key concepts that he includes as part of transnational progressivism. He claims that they promote groups of people, as ascribed by their gender, race, etc. over the individual citizen; that they create dichotomies with groups of people as either oppressors or victims; that their concept of fairness depends on "group proportionalism"; call on dominant institutions to adopt values that take into consideration the perspectives of those they perceive to be victim groups; support diversity over assimilation to accommodate immigrants and demographic change; that democracy itself is being redefined in a post-assimilation age, so that it no longer exclusively reflects the norms and cultures of dominant groups; that they are deconstructing the concept of the nation and national narratives —with statements such as, "we do not need to reinforce sovereignty or 'particularist' nationalism, but rather to strengthen the position of mankind"; that they promote an "ultranational identity" as "citizens of the world", including the concept of post-national citizenship; and that they promote the concept of transnationalism over multiculturalism and/or internationalism. 21st century progressives call for a shift from the obsolete paradigm of assimilation to one that promotes diversity.

== Background ==
In the 1990s, Fonte directed the committee to Review National Standards at right-wing think tank, the American Enterprise Institute, under Lynne Cheney. He was a vocal critic of the 1994 National Standards for United States History—these debates have been called history or cultural wars. Fonte said that the Standards altered the "traditional narrative" which featured European settlers to the United States" by including Amerindian and West African histories. This provided a basis for a "hybrid American multiculture", of which he disapproved. The History Standards were rejected, but the curriculum taught in US public schools in 2002, was not "primarily the creation of Western civilization", but that of a Great Convergence of three civilizations.

In 2000, preparation for the World Conference against Racism 2001, advocacy groups such as Amnesty International U.S.A., Human Rights Watch, the Arab-American Institute, National Council of Churches, the National Association for the Advancement of Colored People, the American Civil Liberties Union, the International Human Rights Law Group, and many otherscalled on the United Nations High Commissioner for Human Rights to put pressure on the United States government to address racism and civil rights in its jurisdiction. Fonte argues that NGOs, unsatisfied with the International Convention on the Elimination of All Forms of Racial Discrimination (CERD)—because of numerous reservations the US had applied—and frustrated by a lack of success in US federal and state bodies, had appealed to global public opinion and outside authority to achieve substantive reform. He insists that "transnational progressivism" is a "hybrid regime", "post-liberal democratic" and "post-American", which he considers an affront "ignoring the very concept of majority rule." In the same year, the AEI hosted a conference entitled Trends in Global Governance: Do They Threaten American Sovereignty, organized by John Bolton, in which he cautioned fellow "Americanists" against the rise of the "globalists", whom he described as law and international relations professors and other academics, media professionals, humanitarian and environmental groups, including those calling for human rights. By then, John Fonte became part of a group labelled "new sovereigntists" by law professor Peter J. Spiro in a 2000 Foreign Affairs article.

Spiro described the "new sovereigntists" as "old-fashioned, conservative anti-internationalists" who continued to influence policymakers in the United States. New Sovereigntists were against who they claim are "globalist academics". These anti-internationalists scrutinize the global governance "agenda" of "leftist" think tanks and humanitarian nongovernmental organizations (NGOs). Spiro described how new sovereigntists claim that national constitutions provide the right to "opt out of international regimes as a matter of power, legal right, and constitutional duty." In 1992, the United States had ratified the International Covenant on Civil and Political Rights (ICCPR) but had little effect on the implementation of domestic civil rights in the US, because it had included an extensive number of reservations. The debate over international human rights laws trumping domestic law was substantial. New sovereigntists consider the "international legal order" to be "illegitimately intru[ding]" in American "domestic affairs"; and that the international lawmaking system is both "unenforceable" and "unaccountable". In a 2011 International Studies Quarterly, co-authored by Goodhart, the authors described the new sovereigntists' challenge to global governance. They say NGOs have gained "significant influence on policymaking" by demanding that governments abide by certain rules and regulations, using courts "to compel compliance". The AEI warned that the "extraordinary growth of 'advocacy NGOs' in liberal democracies has the potential to undermine the sovereignty of constitutional democracies, as well as the effectiveness of 'credible' NGOs". In his 2011 book, Sovereignty or Submission: Will Americans Rule Themselves or be Ruled by Others?, Fonte claims that "[t]ransnational progressives and transnational pragmatists" in international organizations, Western democracies, businesses and civil society groups were seeking to establish "global governance."

== Examples ==
In his theory of transnational progressivism, Fonte and his readers comment negatively on international organizations, including the International Court of Justice, the League of Nations, European Union, and the United Nations, purported political philosophies such as the cultural Marxism conspiracy theory, as well as related concepts or entities related to the potential of organizations to unite at a global level in a way that they fear would threaten liberal democracy in its current form. This includes discussions of cosmopolitanism, Democratic peace theory, federal world government, federalism, global governance, international politics, multilateralism, national sovereignty, new world order politics, the presidential system, supranationalism, transnationalism, world government, and a world political party. In 2016, AEI's John Yoo and Fonte said that transnational democracy—as outlined in a Council on Foreign Relations (CFR) working paper published after the 2012 US presidential election—accurately describes what they call "transnational progressivism". The CFR paper by American political scientist Daniel Deudney and Princeton University politics and international affairs professor, G. John Ikenberry, said that "democratic internationalism" was a better strategy in 2012, than "American exceptionalism." "Democratic internationalism" "builds on and exploits the opportunities of a heavily democratic world," and because of its own long history of democratic reforms, the United States, was "uniquely positioned to pursue a strategy of global democratic renewal". However, as of 2012, the U.S. had "failed to adapt to the end of the Cold War, the decline of the unipolar moment, and the end of American exceptionalism". Yoo and Fonte criticized the paper saying that it called for the reversal of the "Reagan-Thatcher fundamentalist capitalism" by "forging [of] transnational democratic progressive alliances".

The "demographic imperative", group proportionalism, the deconstruction of national narratives and cultural assimilation, are related to changing demographics partly caused by immigration. He fears that it may replace the "strong national sovereignty-assimilationist position" and that immigrants, who are not assimilated, contribute to changing narratives about nations and cites Yoram Hazony's The Jewish State as an example. Hazony says that immigrants—who were not Jewish—accompanying Russian-Jewish emigrants to Israel, gave anti-Zionism considerable support. He is also concerned that non-citizens and ethnic groups will have greater power and status as this movement calls for a change in the "system of majority rule among equal citizens". He cited the example of the Equal Employment Opportunity Commission, which had extended anti-discrimination protection to illegal immigrants, in his critique of progressives who categorize immigrants as the victim in the dichotomous relationship between privileged and marginalized, the oppressor (white males, heterosexuals, and Anglos) and the oppressed victim (blacks, gays, Latinos, immigrants, and women). (Note: According to Fonte, transnational progressives use the theoretical framework based on Antonio Gramsci (1891-1937) and the associated Hegelian Marxist thought. —Fonte, John (2002), "Liberal Democracy vs. Transnational Progressivism: The Future of the Ideological Civil War Within the West" (PDF), Hudson Institute, Orbis, archived from the original (PDF) on December 2, 2008) Fonte rejects progressive calls for "proportional representation by group", through which the "victim" groups should be represented in all professions roughly proportionate to their percentage of the population to avoid underrepresentation. He raised concerns that transnational progressives promoted the "goals" of "identity groups"—the racial, ethnic, and/or gender ascriptive group into which one is born" as the "key political unit"—not the individual citizen.

== Use in right-wing discourse ==
A blogger, Steven Den Beste, introduced Fonte's concept of transnational progressivism in the blogosphere—a term used by the warblog community at that time—in a lengthy detailed post in which he quoted and summarized Fonte's article extensively. In Den Beste's "U.S.S. Clueless" blog that he had published for several years in the early 2000s, he wrote that the underlying political philosophy behind "apparently disparate phenomena", such as the anti-globalization movement, the sustainable development movement, the International Court of Justice, multiculturalism, international human rights organizations, the European Union, the European Commission and other "elitists"—those Beste called, the "Berkeley Liberals", was a common ideology whose conceptual framework was revealed in this essay on transnational progressivism.

In his 2003 book entitled Where Did Social Studies Go Wrong? published by the Thomas B. Fordham Institute, ex-schoolteacher Jonathan Burack insisted "transnational progressives go well beyond traditional commitments to federalism and the separation of powers within a nation" by endorsing "postnational" citizenship. Global citizenship, Burack cautions, is part of a movement that "seeks to shift authority to an institutional network of international organizations and subnational political actors not bound by any clear democratic, constitutional framework". By 2003, the world citizen view was not "dominant among classroom teachers" or in textbooks, but he said that it was a "dynamic theme pushing the social studies field forward". According to Burack, "transnational progressivism" as defined by Fonte, via "global education advocates" focus on "global trends, transnational cultural interchanges, and worldwide problems, especially those that can be depicted as rendering the nation-state obsolete" with the goal of causing "Americans to doubt the ability of their national civic society to deal with global challenges."

In his October 2004 New Criterion article entitled "Gulliver's travails", John O'Sullivan used the metaphor of the United States as the fictional Gulliver in Jonathan Swift's 1726 satire Gulliver's Travels. Gulliver was tied down by the diminutive inhabitants of Lilliput—whose collaborative efforts to subdue the giant Gulliver ultimately failed. O'Sullivan likened international organizations and civil society (such as UN agencies, the World Trade Organization, the International Criminal Court and NGOs) to the Lilliputians pitted against the much larger United States. The web used by this international community includes "international laws, regulations, and treaties, such as the Kyoto accords". By 2008, Fonte had included American business leaders who supported "global governance", in his list of "post-American" "transnational pragmatists". Samuel Huntington has referred to them as "economic transnationals".

In his 2019 book, The Sovereignty Wars, the CFR's Stewart Patrick, said that the strategy of "American exceptionalism" is used by sovereigntists who cite the uniqueness of the U.S. to "keep the U.S. apart from international rules, treaties, or institutions" that they believe might infringe on U.S. business, government and military interests. The Congressional Sovereignty Caucus was launched in 2009, by Congressman Doug Lamborn. Its members were "concerned about the far-reaching implications of international treaties", such as the Comprehensive Test Ban Treaty (CTBT) and the United Nations Convention on the Rights of the Child, as they supported weapons testing, use of corporal punishment by parents and religious schools."

Fonte's 2002 description of transnational progressivism was included as a section of the 2020 "Nemeth Report", one of three commissioned by the Conservative Government of Alberta's "Public Inquiry into Anti-Alberta Energy Campaigns", criticized for promoting climate change denialism and conflicts of interest, claiming that "transnational" progressives were targeting the Athabasca oil sands in an alleged "anti-Alberta" energy campaign. Nemeth claimed that there has been a "comprehensive international assault on Alberta's and Canada's energy industry" by climate action groups. Using the "media and the youth", these entities are pushing through a "cultural shift"—a new global paradigm"—also known as the "Great Transition", "Great Transformation”, and "Global Phase Shift", that will "fundamentally transform the western industrial capitalist economic system" and "our modern way of life." According to Nemeth, this "progressive movement...abhors Alberta and the hydrocarbon industry" and "relishes the idea of their demise."

== Separate use in historical discourse ==
Scholars who contributed to 2008 book, Britain and Transnational Progressivism—edited by David W. Gutzke—use the term to refer to the historical Progressive Era in the late 1890s and early 20th century in the United States, Western Europe, the British Empire, and Japan, which was a period of activism and social reforms. Australian historian Ian Tyrrell in describing "transatlantic progressivism" and the women's temperance movement, said that, in the early years of the movement, "American women saw the trans-Atlantic reform tradition as part of a larger potential for a global spread of Anglo-American values." While Princeton University's Daniel Rodgers, saw the transnational exchange of ideas as mainly originating in the United Kingdom. From 1903 onwards, campaigns for suffrage in Britain and the United States, saw a "reciprocal influence" as campaigns accelerated, according to Tyrrell. (Note: The Australian historian, Ian Tyrrell, has spent decades of his academic career investigating the concept of American exceptionalism and its transnational context. Tyrrell said that Marxists had coined the term "American exceptionalism" as they deepened their understanding of how the United States had bypassed both socialism and Marxism—the number and size of socialist organizations in the United States was relatively small compared to those in France and Germany. —Tyrrell, Ian (1991). "American Exceptionalism in an Age of International History". The American Historical Review. 96 (4): 1031–1055. doi:10.2307/2164993. ISSN 0002-8762. JSTOR 2164993.)

== Use in science fiction ==
In the military science fiction The Tuloriad series' Legacy of the Aldenata by John Ringo and Tom Kratman—who co-authored some of the series—the term "galactic tranzis" is used. Kratman said that his use of "tranzi" was an allegorical reference to the "Transnational Progressive's apparatus and dream" which had to be controlled and ultimately destroyed to prevent a "rather unpleasant future".
