= International Network for a United Nations Second Assembly =

The International Network for a United Nations Second Assembly (INFUSA) is a largely defunct organization devoted to the establishment of a United Nations Parliamentary Assembly. According to Citizens for a United Nations People's Assembly, "in 1982, during the second UN Special Session on Disarmament, Jeffrey Segall presented a proposal for a study on 'a UN Second or Peoples Assembly' which became the basis for an International Network for a UN Second Assembly (INFUSA). From 1988 to 1995 INFUSA and the Association of World Citizens collaborated on a series of annual conferences in New York, San Francisco, Vienna and back in New York". INFUSA once included more than 100 organizations.

== CAMDUN ==
The Campaign for a Democratic United Nations, or CAMDUN, was established in 1989 as a project of INFUSA. It is also largely defunct as of 2012.
