= United Nations Committee on Contributions =

- Established: 14 February 1946; 80 years ago
- Type: General Assembly Committee
- Legal status: Active
- Headquarters: UN Headquarters; New York, United States
- Members: 18 members
- Parent organization: United Nations General Assembly
- Website: www.un.org/en/ga/contributions/

The United Nations Committee on Contributions is a subsidiary body of the United Nations General Assembly that is responsible for advising the General Assembly on the apportionment of UN expenses among member states.

The committee meets annually for three to four weeks, usually in New York in June. These sessions are closed and its meeting records and press releases are not issued.

== Mandate ==
The United Nations Charter, in Article 17, established that "the expenses of the Organization shall be borne by the Members as apportioned by the General Assembly." As such on 13 February 1946, the General Assembly created a 10-member Committee on Contributions with the mandate to apportion UN expenses among members, make assessments for new members, hear appeals by members for a change of assessment and apply Article 19 in cases of arrears in the payment of assessments.

Membership of the committee was increased in 1968 to 12, then to 13 in 1973 and most recently in 1976 to 18 members.

== Members ==
The 18 members of the committee are selected by the General Assembly upon the recommendation of the Fifth Committee and on the basis of broad geographical representation, personal qualifications and experience. They serve three-year terms that end on the 31 December of their respective term. The following are the current members of the committee.

Members
2019–2021		2020–2022		2021–2023	
Member	Country	Member	Country	Member	Country
Syed Yawar Ali	Pakistan	Cheikh Tidiane Deme	Senegal	Michael Holtsch	Germany
Jakub Chmielewski	Poland	Gordon Eckersley	Australia	Ji-sun Jun	Republic of Korea
Robert Ngei Mule	Kenya	Mohamed Mahmoud Ould el Ghaouth	Mauritania	Vadim Laputin	Russian Federation
Toshiro Ozawa	Japan	Bernardo Greiver	Uruguay	Shan Lin	China
Tõnis Saar	Estonia	Ugo Sessi	Italy	Henrique da Silveira Sardinha Pinto	Brazil
Brett Dennis Schaefer	United States of America	Alejandro Torres Lepori	Argentina	Steven Townley	United Kingdom of Great Britain and Northern Ireland
