= Grenville Clark =

American lawyer (1882–1967)

- Born: November 5, 1882; New York City, U.S.
- Died: January 13, 1967 (aged 84); Dublin, New Hampshire, U.S.
- Education: Harvard University (LLB)
- Years active: 1909–1945 (law office)
- Employer(s): Root Clark & Bird (later Dewey Ballantine, Dewey & LeBoeuf)
- Known for: Plattsburgh Citizens' Military Training Camp
- Notable work: World Peace Through World Law with Louis B. Sohn (1958)
- Movement: World Federalist Movement
- Board member of: Harvard Corporation
- Spouse: Fanny Pickman Dwight
- Children: Grenville Clark Jr., Mary Dwight Clark (Thoron), Louisa H. Clark (Spencer)
- Relatives: LeGrand Bouton Cannon (maternal grandfather)

Grenville Clark (November 5, 1882 – January 13, 1967) was a 20th-century American Wall Street lawyer, co-founder of Root Clark & Bird (later Dewey Ballantine, then Dewey & LeBoeuf), member of the Harvard Corporation, co-author of the book World Peace Through World Law, and nominee for the Nobel Peace Prize.

The National Historic Register (US DOI, National Park Services) has called Clark an "international lawyer and legal architect of world organizations," who was "active in world peace efforts and an advisor in governmental affairs." Further, he was a "drafter of the United Nations Charter, author of A Plan for Peace and co-author of the acclaimed World Peace Through World Law. He was an advisor to four United States Presidents, founder of the Military Training Camp Association (1917) and leader of the Plattsburg movement, and author of the Selective Service Act of 1940. Clark organized the two Dublin Peace Conferences, held at the Morse Farm in 1945 and 1965, out of which grew the United World Federalists."

== Background ==
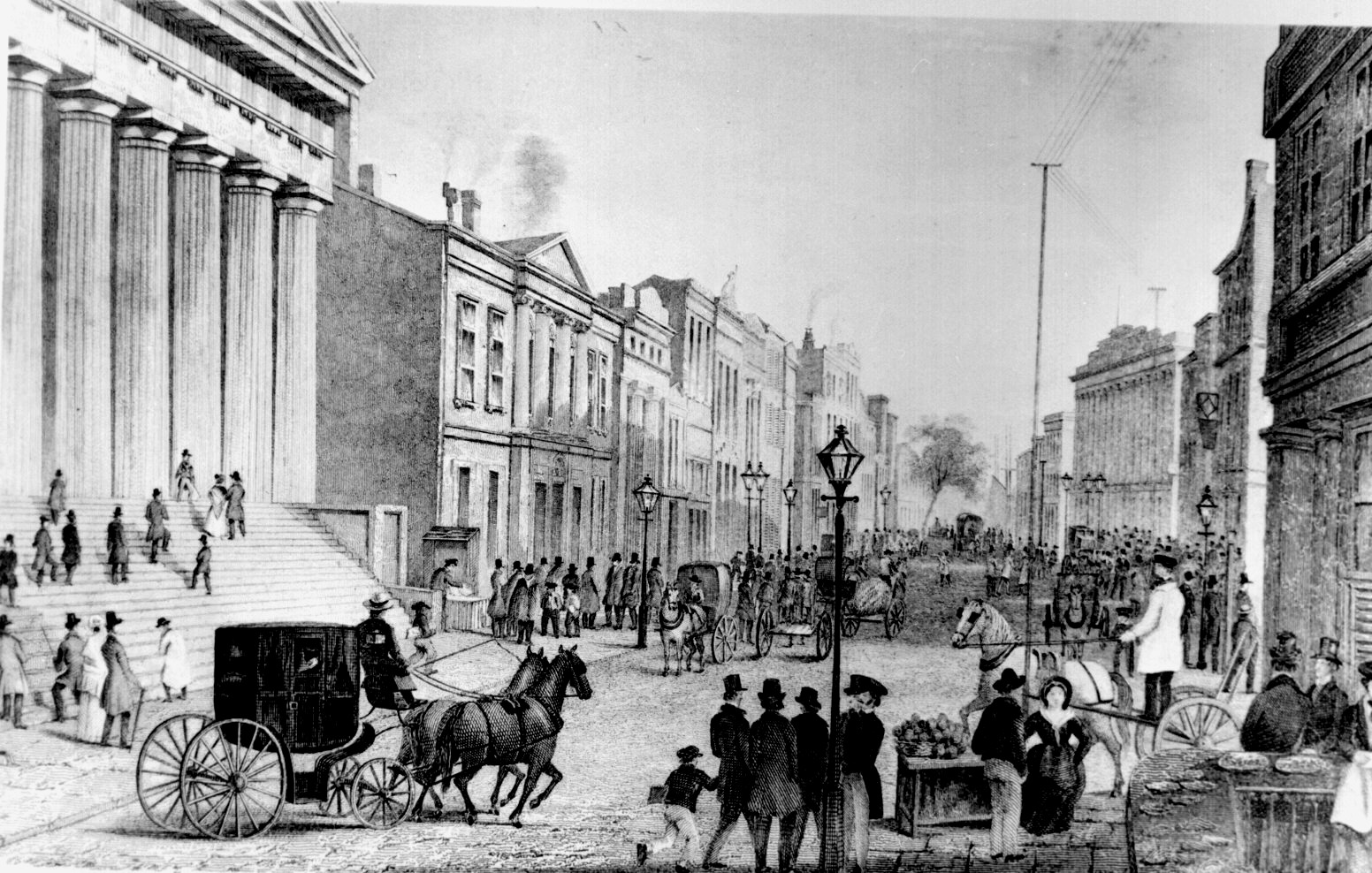
Wall Street (1867), where Clark's father worked in the latter 19th century

Grenville Clark was born on November 5, 1882, in New York City. His parents were Louis Crawford Clark and Marian de Forest Cannon. His father attended Harvard University and worked all his life at his father's banking firm (Clark, Dodge & Company) on Wall Street. His mother was the granddaughter of banker Colonel LeGrand Bouton Cannon (1815–1906); the family lived in her grandfather's mansion in Manhattan. He had three brothers and a sister.

In 1903, he entered Harvard Law School, where he met classmate Felix Frankfurter. "The two became close friend and sometimes conspirators on public service projects throughout their lives." The childless Frankfurter was unofficial "uncle" to Clark's children. When Frankfurter retired from the United States Supreme Court, Clark took care of financial matters like medical bills.

== Career ==
=== Law practice ===
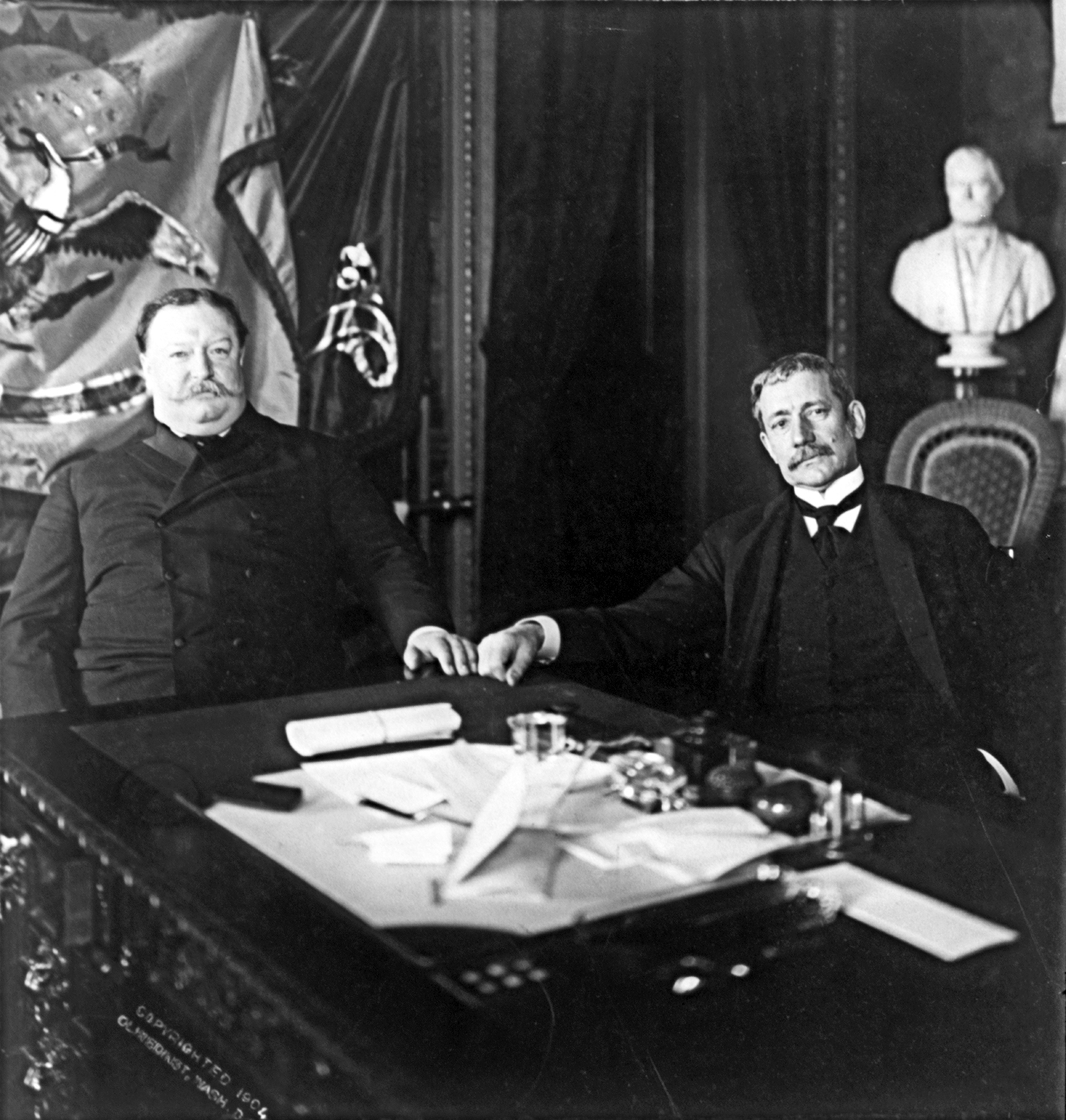
Elihu Root (with William Howard Taft in 1904), Clark's legal partner

In 1909, Harvard Law School graduates Clark, Francis W. Bird, and Elihu Root, Jr. (son of Elihu Root, Sr.) founded the law firm of Root, Clark & Bird. An early member and star of the firm was Henry Friendly, recommended by Frankfurter and following a one-year clerkship with Supreme Court Justice Louis Brandeis. In 1913, the firm merged with Buckner & Howland to form Root, Clark, Buckner & Howland. In 1919, Arthur A. Ballantine, the Internal Revenue Service's first solicitor, joined. Ballantine and Buckner ran the firm throughout the 1920s and 1930s. During the Great Depression, the firm flourished by moving away from its traditional focus on litigation and began to focus on bankruptcy and reorganizations and New Deal regulations. The firm also built up a corporate practice, serving clients such as AT&T and Standard Oil. Overall, the firm expanded from eight (8) to 74 associates and opened a second office in Washington, D.C. Both Henry Friendly and John Marshall Harlan II worked at the firm during this period. In 1931, the offices of Root, Clark, Buckner & Ballantine were at 31 Nassau Street (Manhattan) in Manhattan. (The firm later merged to form Dewey Ballantine, currently Dewey & LeBoeuf.)

During World War I, Clark helped establish the Citizens' Military Training Camp at Plattsburgh, New York and other forms of military preparedness.

In 1931, Clark was elected one of the five fellows (plus Harvard University president and treasurer) of the Harvard Corporation, a body overseeing the university since 1650. In 1933, he was instrumental in having James Bryant Conant elected president of Harvard University; the two become close friends. In 1950, he retired from the Corporation, for which he received an honorary doctoral degree in law.

In 1933, he helped draft Economy Act of 1933. He joined in drafting committee amicus briefs to the Supreme Court in defense of free speech and, in the flag salute cases, asserting the right of individuals on conscientious grounds not to salute the flag. In July 1938, Clark founded the American Bar Association’s Bill of Rights Committee, as a means to unite both left and right in defense of civil liberties. As illustrative examples of increasing threats to individual freedom, he cited “suppression of free speech and assembly” by Jersey City Mayor Frank Hague, attacks on the people's “right of petition concerning legislation” by Senator Sherman Minton and, finally, proposals “to establish Governmental radio broadcasting.”

In 1940, as a member of the Military Training Camps Association, a World War I veterans' group, Clark authored the Burke-Wadsworth Bill. During World War II, Clark again helped with military preparedness, including the drafting of the Selective Training and Service Act of 1940. From 1940 to 1945, he served as confidential counsel to Secretary of War Henry L. Stimson.

In 1945, Clark retired from the law firm.

=== World peace ===
United Nations Charter (1945)

On October 16, 1945, before the UN Charter entered into force, Clark, retired U.S. Supreme Court Justice Owen J. Roberts, former New Hampshire Governor Robert P. Bass, and more than forty others held the "Dublin Conference" in Dublin, New Hampshire. There they passed a "Dublin Declaration", which, judging the UN Charter inadequate to preserve peace, proposed transformation of the U.N. General Assembly into a world legislature. It stated, "Such a government should be based upon a constitution under which all peoples and nations will participate upon a basis of balanced representation which will take account of natural and industrial resources and other factors as well as population. It cannot be based on treaties...in which the states... act and vote as states". It called for "limited but definite and adequate power for the prevention of war."

In 1965, Clark held a second "Dublin Conference", which made a second declaration. About that time, he founded the "Grenville Clark Institute for World Law." In 1967, its committee members comprised: Thomas H. Mahony, Douglas Arant, Mrs. Mildred R. Blake, Mrs. William W. Bray, Henry B. Cabot, Grenville Clark Jr., Randolph P. Compton, Rev. Robert Drinan SJ, H. Ferry, Hudson Hoagland, Harry B. Hollins, Walter J. Leonard, Mrs. Edward W. McVitty, J. A. Migel, Gerard Piel, Stanley K. Platt, Gabriel Reiner, Robert H. Reno, William G. Saltonstall, Louis B. Sohn, C. Maxwell Stanley, James P. Warburg, and Abraham Wilson. Its executive committee comprised: Hudson Hoagland, George C. Holt, Thomas H. Mahony, Robert H. Reno. Its executive director was George C. Holt. The group's base was in Woodstock, Connecticut.

Clark and other participants in the Dublin Conference became active in the United World Federalists (UWF) and the global World Federalist Movement. UWF enjoyed some success in the postwar period, as 23 state legislatures passed bills supporting the organization’s goals, but McCarthyism prompted many prominent members to resign lest Senator Joseph McCarthy ruin their careers. In the United States, internationalism came to be associated with communism.

After formation of the United Nations, Clark supported the World Federalist Movement. Clark and Harvard Law School professor Louis B. Sohn drafted amendments to the United Nations Charter. Their amendments sought to transform the United Nations into a true world federal government. They limited its primary powers to suppression of war, a radical redirection that would have required global disarmament and formation of a world police force. They published their writings in World Peace Through World Law, published in 1958.

== Personal life and death ==
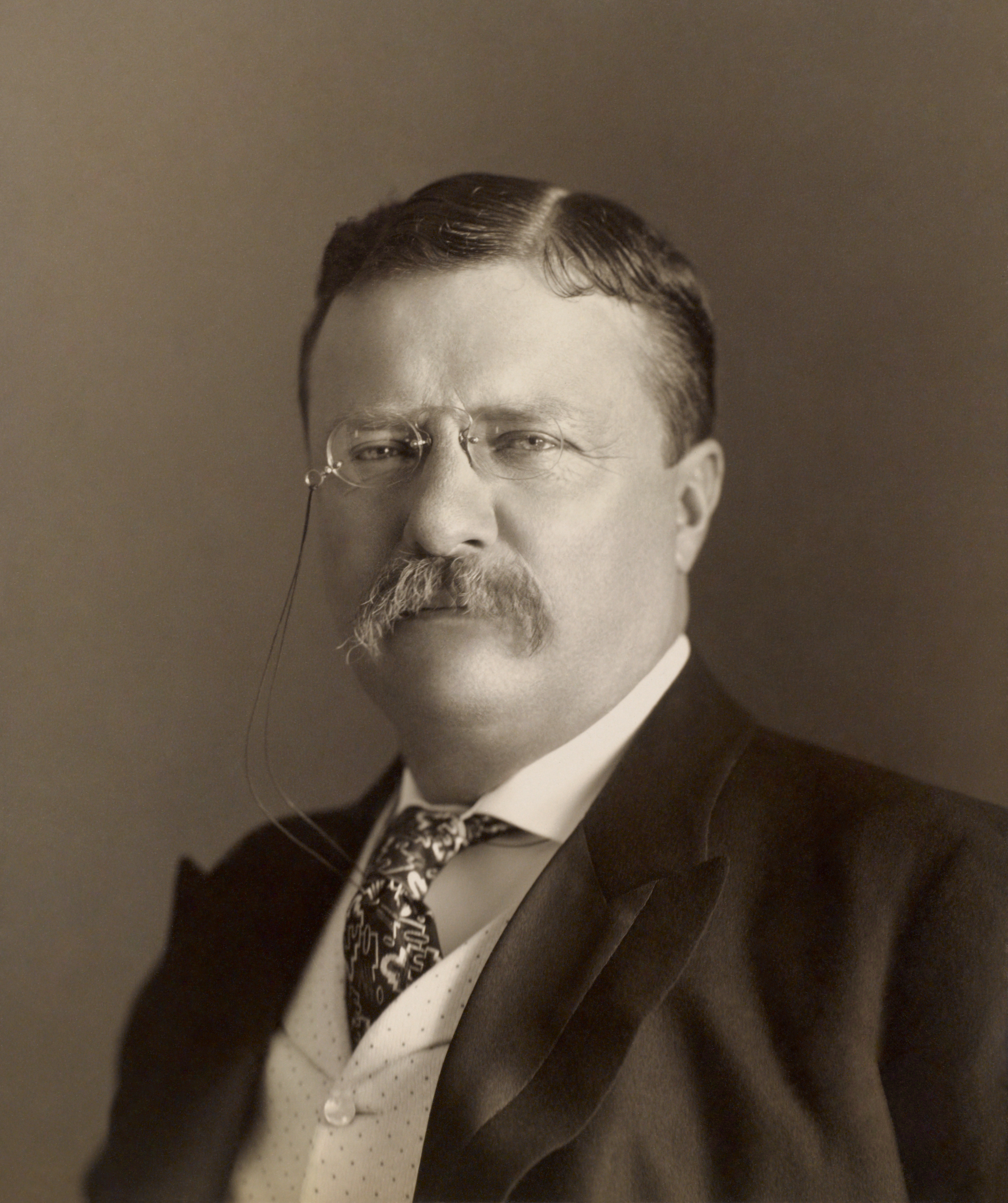
Theodore Roosevelt (circa 1904) was a personal friend of Clark's

On November 27, 1909, Clark married Fanny Pickman Dwight. They had four children: Eleanor Clark (who died in childhood), Grenville Clark Jr., Mary Dwight Clark (Thoron), and Louisa H. Clark (Spencer).

He was a personal friend of Teddy Roosevelt.

As a member of the Harvard Corporation, Clark was a friend of William L. Marbury, Jr., from whom he received correspondence during the Hiss Case in 1948. (Hiss was acting UN secretary general at the UN's first-ever session in 1945.) In 1949, Clark made a donation (a "very moderate check I sent toward legal expenses") to the Hiss defense fund, for which Hiss thanked him, followed by a letter from Clark to Hiss in which he stated that he had "no personal acquaintance with you."

Clark died on January 13, 1967, at his home in Dublin, New Hampshire.

== Awards ==
Between 1959 and 1964, Clark received several nominations for the Nobel Peace Prize

== Works ==
- Spendthrift Trusts in New York: Needed Reforms in the Law (1914)
- Jubilee Law Lectures, 1889-1939 with Roscoe Pound, Daniel J. Lyne, Hector David Castro, and John J. Burns (1939)
- A Memorandum: With Regard to a New Effort to Organize Peace and Containing a Proposal for a "Federation of Free Peoples" (1939)
- Citizens Committee for a National War Service Act: Effort for a national service law in World War II, 1942-1945; report to the National Council of the Citizens Committee for a National War Service Act, by Grenville Clark, chairman, and Arthur L. Williston, secretary (1947)
- Freedom at Harvard, 1949 (1949)
- Plan for Peace (1950)
- Peace through disarmament and charter revision (1953)
- "A Digest of Peace through Disarmament and Charter Revision" (1953)
- World Peace Through World Law: Two Alternative Plans with Louis B. Sohn (1958) (1960) (1966)
- The Need for Total Disarmament Under Enforceable World Law (1964)
- A Proposed Treaty Establishing a World Disarmament and World Development Organization (1965)
- Roundtable III: Summary of Convocation (1965) [sound recording]

== Legacy ==
In 1937, Edgar Snow dedicated his book Red Star Over China to Clark, writing: "To Grenville Clark who was taller than his time 'Laid sweet in his grave, the hope of humanity not yet subjugate in him.' – Emerson."

The 1958 book World Peace through World Law remains Clark's lasting legacy.

In 1969, Clark donated the Clark Botanic Garden to the Brooklyn Botanic Garden.

In 1985, the US Postal Service honored Clark posthumously with a 39¢ Great Americans series (1980–2000) postage stamp.

== See also ==
- World Peace Through World Law
- World Federalist Movement/Institute for Global Policy
- Louis B. Sohn
- Emory Buckner
- Harvard Corporation
- James Bryant Conant
- William L. Marbury, Jr.
- Alger Hiss
