= Vicente Blanco Gaspar =

Spanish diplomat and writer (born 1941)

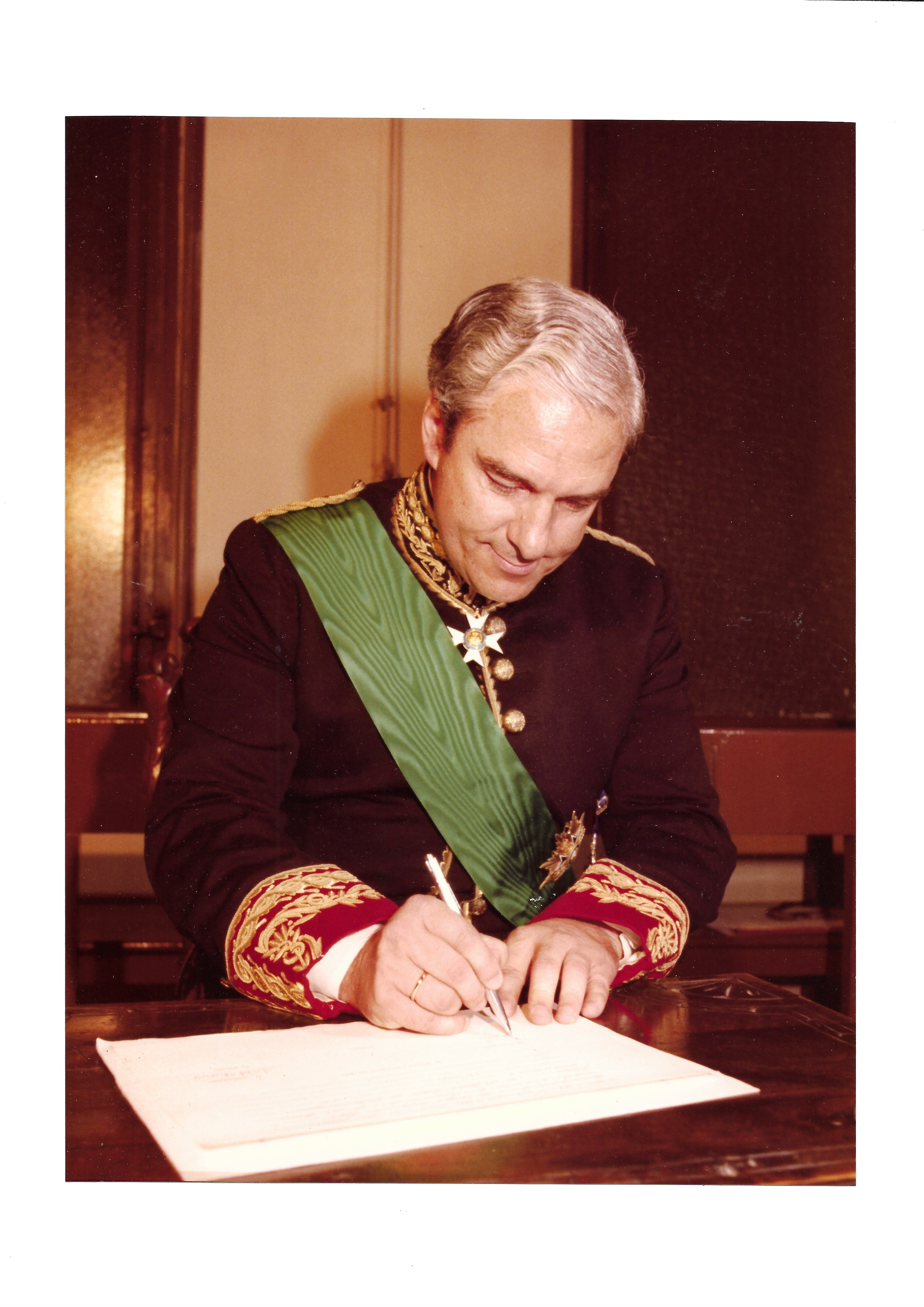
- Born: August 13, 1941; Burgos, Spain
- Occupations: Ambassador; writer

Academic background
- Education: Harvard University

Academic work
- Discipline: Law
- Institutions: Harvard Law School

Vicente Blanco Gaspar (born August 13, 1941) is a Spanish ambassador, diplomat and writer who is an expert in international law, diplomacy and international organizations.

== Biography ==
Blanco Gaspar studied law at the Complutense University of Madrid between 1958 and 1963. The same year he obtained his law degree, he obtained a scholarship from the Fulbright Program to continue his education at the University of Michigan where he studied a master's degree in comparative law on international aggression with Professor Wm.W. Bishop. He continued researching the issue of weighted voting and writing his doctoral thesis at Harvard University where he was an assistant professor, in 1965 under Louis B. Sohn professor of international law and in 1966 under Roger Fisher, professor of international negotiation. Roger Fisher, author of Getting to Yes, devised what is known as the Harvard Negotiation Project which served as a model for creative negotiation instruments in the Camp David Agreements.

In 1975 Blanco Gaspar obtained the degree of Doctor of Law, cum laude. He was professor in charge of the chair of public and private international law at the University of Alcalá de Henares between 1980 and 1985. He developed his research in international relations, among other institutions, at the Higher Council for Scientific Research. His field of research covers the field of jurisprudence, International Organizations and International Law, being a specialist in the analysis of European and African relations with the Spanish reality.

Blanco Gaspar was co-founder and president of the Harvard Club of Spain from 1980 to 1986. Since December 13, 1982, he has been an academic at the Royal Academy of Jurisprudence and Legislation.

In his book The Weighted Vote, he analyzes the weight of the votes assigned to each country in international organizations, and the impact that this allocation has on the financing of their economies. Professor Adolfo Miaja de la Muela participated in the prologue of the book together with Louis B. Sohn and José Luis de Azcárraga y Bustamante. Sohn said in his foreword that the book "is an in-depth study of one of the most complex problems and could have been the last word on the subject were it not for the fact that the ingenuity of the human mind can produce new ideas, elements or formulas...The time to realize this idea is coming and we should all be grateful that the author has put in the enormous effort to gather this information for us in such a clear and well-organized way." In this book, Blanco Gaspar analyzes and studies numerous international conferences to expose how these events have become a fundamental tool in contemporary diplomacy. Blanco Gaspar argues for three reasons for the priority of these summit conferences organized by each international organization after the Second World War: the representation of each state in its president, the increase in the sectorial dimensions in the foreign relations of each country, and the advances technologies in transport and communication systems that facilitate meetings.

Blanco Gaspar has written numerous scientific articles, publications and books. His publications have obtained various awards, such as the book El voto ponderado has been awarded the Luis García Arias Award, granted by the Hispanic-Portuguese American Institute of International Law in 1980 and the jury chaired by the Foreign Minister of Venezuela, Efraín Schacht Aristiguieta, unanimously awarded it.

=== Writer ===
Among the articles written by Blanco Gaspar are "Differential Voting Strength" published in the collective work Essays in Honor of Louis B. Sohn, Contemporary Issues in International Law, a publication with articles by 23 former collaborators of the professor Louis B. Sohn from around the world. Other articles have been published in specialized magazines on international policy issues such as Mediterranean Security Problems. Aspects of Security in the Eastern Mediterranean: The Suez Crisis published in the International Policy Magazine of the Institute of Political Studies, or the article "Transboundary pollution in the OECD and its impact on Maritime Law" in the collective publication Liber Amicorum: Legal Studies in Homage to Professor Dr. Antonio Rodríguez Sastre, in recognition of the president of the Spanish section of International Law Association.

Among the books published by Blanco Gaspar are The United Kingdom in Europe with a prologue by Michael Portillo on the succession of events described in the book. In the prologue on International Law, Community and European Union Professor Antonio Rodríguez Sastre considers that the book is necessary to promote a global analysis of the relationships between homogeneous legal fields. Professor Roger Fisher, prefaced The Bases of European Unity. The Weighted Vote includes two Greek precedents of weighted voting systems, the Liga of Licia that lasted from 168 BC to 50 AD and the Amphictyonic council.

=== Lawyer ===
Blanco Gaspar was a lawyer, approved to practice before the New York State Court of Appeals, at Sullivan & Cromwell on Wall Street between 1967 and 1968. He worked especially with John R. Stevenson in the dispute over the dam called Gut Dam between the US and Canada regarding the contamination by Canada of the waters of the St. Lawrence River, in which Sullivan & Cromwell acted as counsel for Canada.

=== Diplomatic ===
Blanco Gaspar entered the diplomatic rank in 1968 and retired in 2011 with the category of Ambassador of Spain.

Blanco Gaspar was deputy chief of mission of the International Legal Department, deputy director-general of Conventional Policy and International Organizations in the General Directorate of Consular Affairs, head of studies of the Diplomatic School of Spain and advisory member in the technical office of the undersecretary. Abroad, he was second secretary in Port-au-Prince, first secretary (2nd head) at the Permanent Mission to the OECD, consul in Metz, in charge a.i. (ad interim) of the consulate general in Strasbourg, consul general in Rio de Janeiro, minister counselor, (2nd Headquarters) at the Embassy in London and Consul General in Munich. Gaspar was designated as Ambassador of Spain in the Republic of Finland since November 1996 and in the Republic of Estonia (residing in Helsinki) from 1997, until September 2000.

When Blanco Gaspar was consul in Metz, he was in charge "ad interim" of the Consulate General in Strasbourg to coordinate the participation of the Spanish residents in his meeting with the President of the Government, Adolfo Suárez González, on the occasion of his presence in Strasbourg to fulfill the provisions of the Act of Accession of Spain of November 24, 1977 to the London Treaty of May 5, 1949, that created the Council of Europe. In Strasbourg, the President of the Spanish Government took possession of the site of Spain at the headquarters of the Council of Europe.

Blanco Gaspar has received multiple recognitions throughout his diplomatic career, highlighting the medals of Knight of the Order of Civil Merit (Spain), Commander of the National Order Honneur et Mérite of Haiti, Grand Officer's Cross of the Order of Rio Branco, from Brazil, Grand Cross of the Order of the Lion of Finland.

== Awards and achievements ==
- 1963 Fulbright Program at the University of Michigan
- 1964-65 Winner 7 times of the Ames Competition (litigation between students before a moot court following the pedagogical methodologies of James Barr Ames) as a member of the Scott Club of Harvard Law School.
- 1980 Fulbright Scholar at the Salzburg Global Seminar.
- 1981 "El voto ponderado" Luis García Arias Award. Hispano-Portuguese-American Institute of International Law. ISBN 84-600-2197-1.
- 1982 Academic of the Royal Academy of Jurisprudence and Legislation.
- 2009 Ambassador of Spain.

== Collaborations ==
In 1966 Blanco Gaspar collaborated with Roger Fisher on a paper on the 1956 Suez Crisis for the American Society of International Law, ASIL in Washington D.C. It was one of the studies integrated into the International Crises and the Rule of Law project, focused on establishing the thesis that international law serves to achieve peace by valuing the importance of negotiation. This is one of the works with which the path to the study of international negotiation began and served to create the Harvard Negotiation Project. The research work carried out was presented by Professor Roger Fisher in December 1966 in the panel on Relevance of International Law to Government Decision Making in the War, collected in a 120-page document for the American Society of International Law. The study analyzes the position of the United States regarding the nationalization of the Suez Canal, defending freedom of passage and the principles of international law. Keeping the peace meant that the United States restricted possible actions against Egypt. The work carried out explores how international law influenced the decisions made by each of the governments involved in the conflict, within the framework of war and peace. In the conclusions it is stated that the United States accepted the legal norms of international law, while the other parties involved relied on international law to a lesser extent.

== Selected works ==
=== Thesis ===
- 1974 The Weighted Vote at the International Level, doctoral thesis presented at the Faculty of Law (Complutense University of Madrid), digitization: Madrid, 2015.

=== Books ===
- 1973 International Aggression: Attempts at Definition. Spanish National Research Council. Madrid. ISBN 84-00-03879-7.
- 1981 The Weighted Vote. Hispano-Portuguese-American Institute of International Law. EDERSA (Editorial Revista de Derecho Privado, S.A.) Madrid. ISBN 84-600-2197-1.
- 1986 International Law, Community and European Union. International Law Association-Spanish Section and Fundación Juan March. Madrid. ISBN 84-398-7520-7.
- 1990 The Bases of European Unity. REUS. Madrid. ISBN 978-84-290-1325-2.
- 2000 The United Kingdom in Europe, EDERSA. Madrid. ISBN 84-607-0624-9.

=== Articles ===
- 1970 "Mediterranean Security Problems. Aspects of Security in the Eastern Mediterranean: The Suez Crisis". International Policy Magazine of the Institute of Political Studies. Nos, 109, pp. 15–32, 110, pp, 7-21 and 111, pp, 85-128.
- 1985 "Transboundary Pollution in the OECD and Its Impact On Maritime Law". In the collective work Liber Amicorum: Legal Studies in Tribute to Professor Dr. Antonio Rodríguez Sastre. Madrid.
- 2021 "Energy sources and the creation of the International Energy Agency", number 146 of Diplomacy XXI Century Magazine, pages 42–47.

== See also ==
- Louis B. Sohn
- Roger Fisher
