= Ruth E. Bacon =

American foreign service officer (1908–1985)

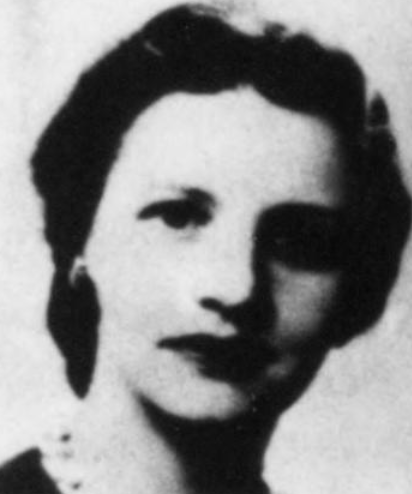
- Ruth E. Bacon, from a 1961 publication of the United States federal government
- Born: 1908
- Died: 1985
- Occupation(s): foreign service officer, Far East specialist
- Relatives: Dorothy Carolin Bacon (sister)
- Awards: Carnegie Fellowship (1928–1929), Federal Woman's Award (1961)

Ruth Elizabeth Bacon (1908–1985) was an American foreign service officer, an East Asian specialist. She was one of the first six annual recipients of the Federal Woman's Award, in 1961. In 1968, she retired as director of the Office of Regional Affairs in the Bureau of East Asian and Pacific Affairs, at the United States Department of State.

== Early life and education ==
Bacon was the daughter of George Preston Bacon and Hannah Churchill Bacon. Her mother trained as a nurse; her father was a physics and engineering professor at Tufts College. Her sister Dorothy Carolin Bacon was an economics professor on the faculty at Smith College. Ruth E. Bacon earned a bachelor's degree and a Ph.D. at Radcliffe College. She was a Carnegie Fellow in international law at the University of Cambridge from 1928 to 1929.

== Career ==
Ruth E. Bacon taught history and political science at Wellesley College and Central Missouri State University after completing her doctoral studies. She worked at The Hague, as assistant to Judge Manley Ottmer Hudson while he served on the Permanent Court of International Justice. She joined the U. S. State Department in 1939, in the Bureau of Far Eastern Affairs; she was described as "the first female officer in a geographical bureau". She was an active member of the American Society of International Law, including a stint on the executive council of the society, from 1951 to 1952.

In 1948 Bacon was a member of the American delegation at the South Pacific Commission in Sydney; she also served on the American delegation to the United Nations Trusteeship Council in 1949. She was Deputy Chief of Mission at the United States Embassy in Wellington, New Zealand for four years, and served at times as acting ambassador. In 1960, she was Foreign Service Officer Class 1, the second-highest ranking woman in the Foreign Service. In 1968, as director of the Office of Regional Affairs in the Bureau of East Asian and Pacific Affairs, she was the only woman in the American delegation led by Dean Rusk at the SEATO meeting, in Wellington. She said the biggest thing she lacked as a diplomat was "a wife. I had to carry a double load... write the thank-you notes, send flowers, plan guest lists and all the other things usually handled by the hostess."

In 1961, Bacon became one of the first six recipients of the Federal Woman's Award, "in recognition of her outstanding contributions to the formulation of United States foreign policy in the field of Far Eastern affairs." Her sister accepted the award in her place. She retired from the federal government in 1968. In 1974 she served on the United Nations Commission on the Status of Women, attended the World Conference on Women in 1975 in Mexico City, and was director of the US Center for International Women's Year from 1973 to 1976. She went on lecture tour in Africa in 1974, sponsored by the State Department, and visited South Africa, Tanzania, Kenya, and Ethiopia. In 1977 she was a Woodrow Wilson Visiting Fellow, lecturing at colleges from Vermont and Virginia to Hawaii.

== Publications ==
Publications by Bacon included "Representation in the International Commission of the Danube" (1937, The American Journal of International Law), International Legislation (1937, co-edited with Manley O. Hudson), and World Court Reports: A Collection of the Judgments, Orders and Opinions of the Permanent Court of International Justice. Volume III, 1932–1935 (1938, co-edited with Manley O. Hudson).

== Personal life ==
Ruth E. Bacon died in 1985, aged 77 years. Her grave is in Shawsheen Cemetery in Bedford, Massachusetts, with those of many other Bacons, for several generations.
