= Dorothy Carolin Bacon =

American economist

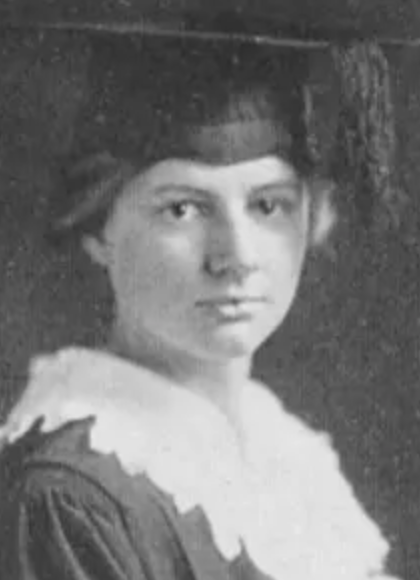
- Dorothy Carolin Bacon, from the 1922 yearbook of Radcliffe College
- Born: February 25, 1902; Beloit, Wisconsin
- Died: November 8, 1998 (aged 96); Meriden, Connecticut
- Occupations: Economist, college professor
- Relatives: Ruth E. Bacon (sister)

Dorothy Carolin Bacon (February 25, 1902 – November 8, 1998) was an American economist and college professor. She was an economics professor at Smith College for over thirty years, beginning in 1927, and worked for various federal agencies during her career. She was a Fulbright Scholar in 1956 and 1957, studying credit institutions in the Philippines.

== Early life and education ==
Bacon was born in Beloit, Wisconsin, the daughter of George Preston Bacon and Hannah Churchill Bacon. Her father was a physics professor and dean of engineering at Tufts University, and her mother worked as a nurse during the 1918 influenza pandemic. Her younger sister was Ruth E. Bacon, a foreign service officer. The sisters were close, and Dorothy Bacon shopped for Ruth Bacon's work wardrobe when she was a diplomat.

Bacon attended Simmons College from 1918 to 1919, and graduated from Radcliffe College in 1922. She stayed at Radcliffe to earn a master's degree in 1924, and a PhD in economics in 1928, with a dissertation titled "Maladjustment of Prices with Special Reference to the Wholesale Prices of Commodities in the United States; 1890-1896".

== Career ==
Bacon was a professor of economics at Vassar College from 1924 to 1926, and at Smith College from 1927 into the 1960s. She wrote Recent Economic History of Five Towns (1937). She served on an awards committee of the American Association of University Women in 1940.

In the 1930s, Bacon worked for the Works Progress Administration and the Federal Deposit Insurance Corporation (FDIC). In 1939, she was among the "leading instructors in economics" who signed a letter opposing a sales tax in Massachusetts. In the 1940s, she worked for the Office of Price Administration. She consulted for the Brookings Institution in the 1950s, and worked with the National Bureau of Economic Research. She was a Fulbright Scholar in the Philippines from 1956 to 1957.

== Publications ==
- "A Monthly Index of Commodity Prices, 1890–1900" (1926)
- "The Significance of Fixed-Base and Link Relatives in Studies of Price Stability—a Comment on the Behavior of Prices" (1928)
- Recent Economic History of Five Towns (1937)
- "New Credit Patterns for the Rise from Colonialism: The Case of the Philippines" (1959)
- "New Credit Institutions for New Nations: The Case of the Philippines" (1965)

== Personal life ==
Bacon died in 1998, aged 96 years, in Meriden, Connecticut. Her grave is with her parents' graves, at Shawsheen Cemetery in Massachusetts.

She was married to Lauchlin Bernard Currie. They had two sons.
