= Manley Ottmer Hudson =

American judge (1886–1960)

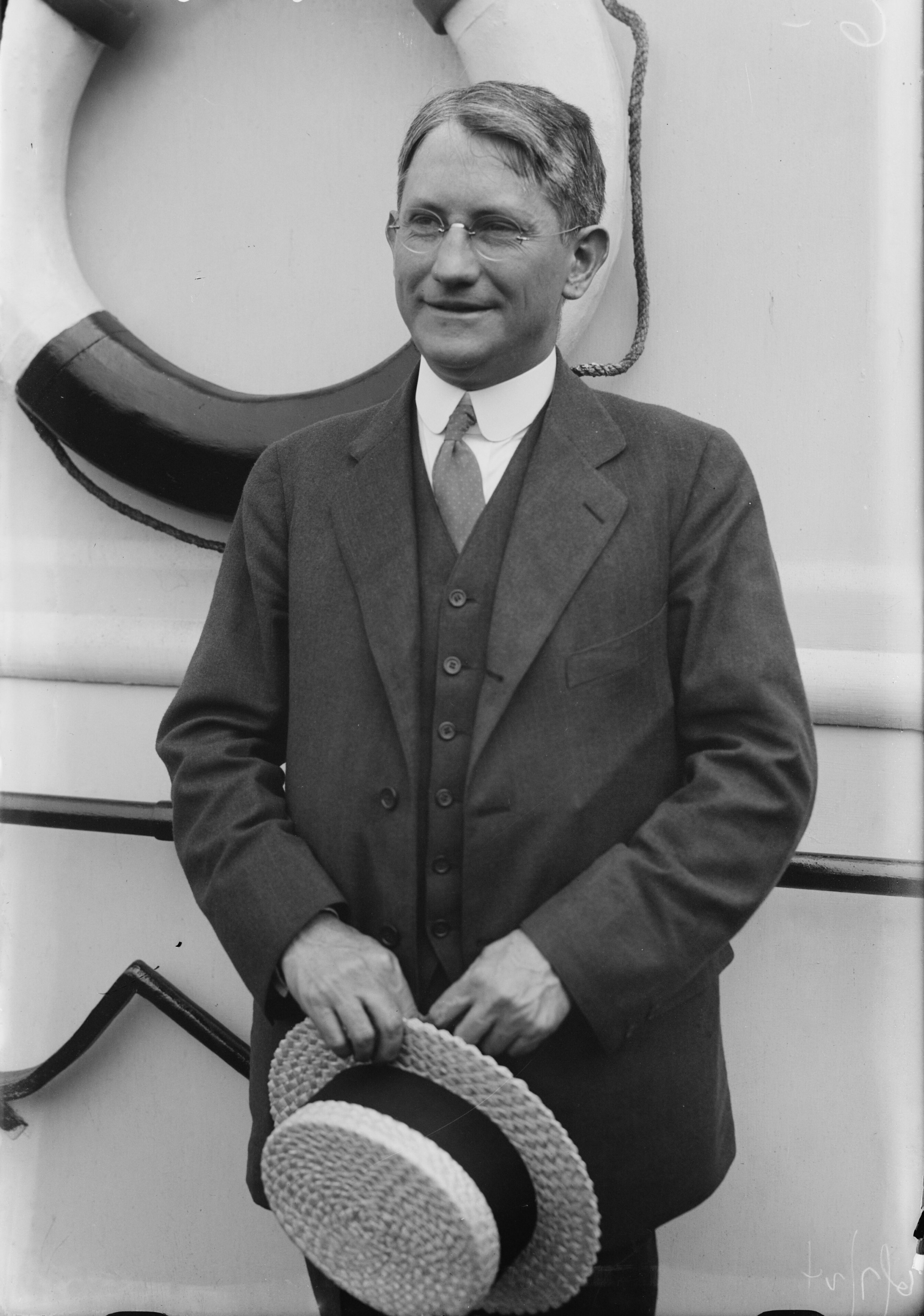
- Hudson in 1924
- Born: May 19, 1886; Saint Peters, Missouri, U.S.
- Died: April 13, 1960 (aged 73); Cambridge, Massachusetts, U.S.
- Education: William Jewell College (BA, MA); Harvard University (LLB, SJD)
- Occupations: Professor, International law jurist, Chairman of the International Law Commission
- Known for: Work in public international law

Manley Ottmer Hudson (May 19, 1886 – April 13, 1960) was an American lawyer specializing in public international law. He was a judge at the Permanent Court of International Justice, a member of the International Law Commission, and a mediator in international conflicts. Hudson has been credited with shaping the American perspective on international law.

The American Society of International Law named a medal after him; as did Harvard University and University of Missouri School of Law with a professorship.

== Biography ==
=== Early life and education ===
Hudson was born in Saint Peters, Missouri. He studied at the William Jewell College in Liberty, Missouri, achieving a bachelor's degree in 1906 and master's degree in 1907. While at William Jewell, Hudson was initiated into the Alpha-Omega chapter of Kappa Sigma fraternity. In 1910 he earned a LL.B. from Harvard Law School, as well as a S.J.D. in 1917. He received further PhDs from William Jewell College (1928), the University of Missouri (1931), and the University of Delaware (1934).

=== Career ===
Hudson began his teaching career at the University of Missouri School of Law in 1912 before moving to Harvard in 1919, heading the department of international law from 1923 to 1954. He also was a guest lecturer at the Hague Academy of International Law (1925), the University of Calcutta (1927), and the Graduate Institute of International Studies in 1936. Furthermore, he was an advisor and member of the law department of the League of Nations, the United States Department of State, and others.

He became editor of the American Journal of International Law in 1924. Hudson married Janet Norton Aldrich in 1930 and was the father of two sons, Manley Ottmer, Jr. and Peter.

Hudson was elected to the American Academy of Arts and Sciences in 1931 and the American Philosophical Society in 1941.

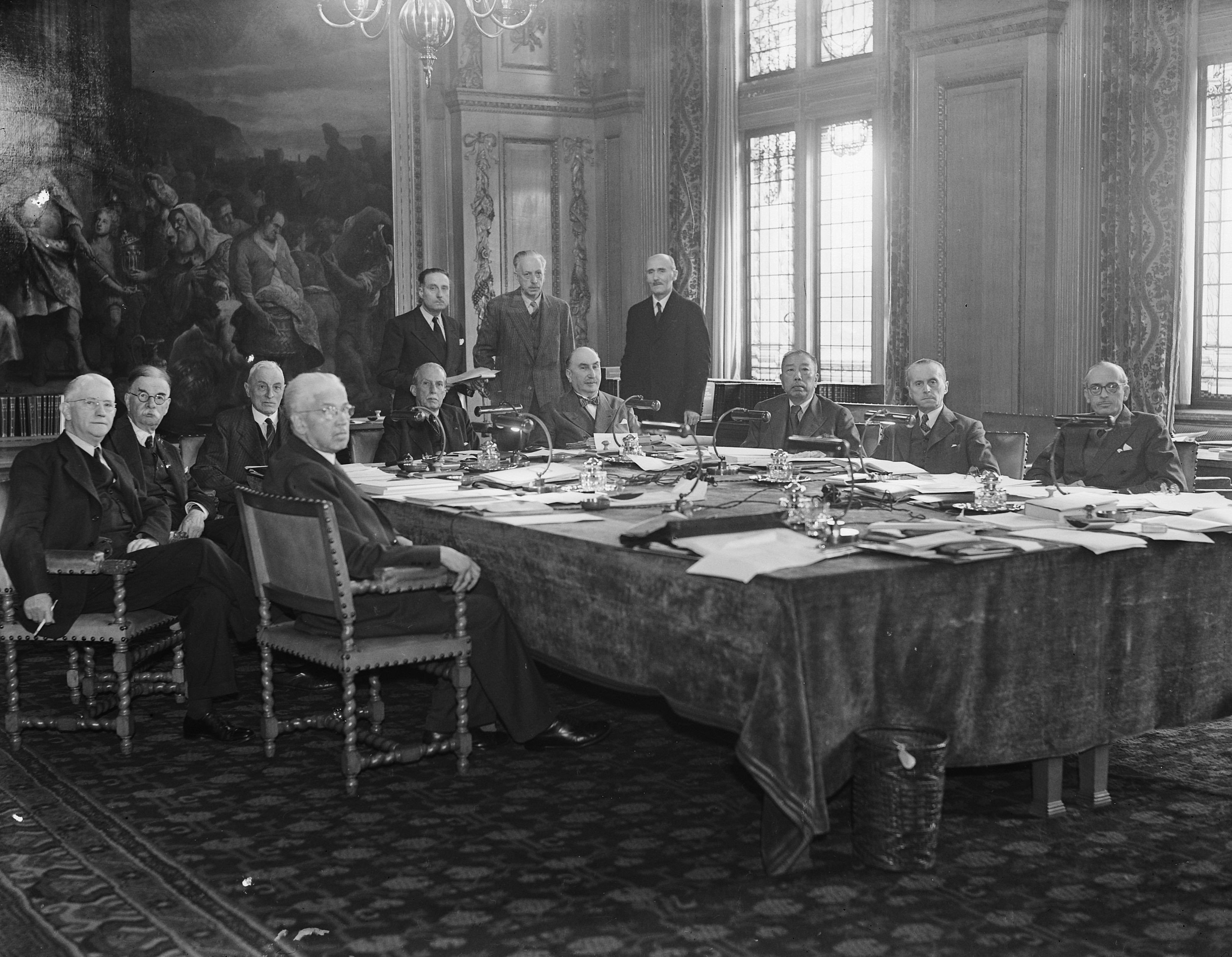
Hudson (left) at the Permanent International Court of Justice (1945)

A member of the Permanent Court of Arbitration since 1933, he became a judge at the Permanent Court of International Justice in 1936 and held that position until the dissolution of that court in 1946. Since 1936, he was an associate of the Institut de Droit International. He also was an advisor and lecturer for international law at the Naval War College from 1946 to 1952. From 1949 to 1952, he was president of the American Society of International Law and first chairman of the International Law Commission. He was appointed Special Rapporteur for the study of nationality including statelessness by the International Law Commission on 26 July 1951.

=== Death and legacy ===
He retired in 1954, and died in Cambridge, Massachusetts, on April 13, 1960.

His widow gave his collected 18,000 letters, notes, and manuscripts to the library of Harvard in 1964. He left his collection of 1000 law books to the American Society of International Law, which created the Manley-O.-Hudson medal in his honor. He was nominated for the Nobel peace prize in 1933 and 1951. His successor at Harvard was Louis Bruno Sohn.

Both the University of Missouri School of Law and Harvard Law School have established professorships in Hudson's name. Notable past and present holders of these posts include David Kennedy and S.I. Strong.

== Works ==
- The Permanent Court of International Justice and the Question of American Participation. Cambridge, MA: Harvard University Press, 1925.
- Current International Cooperation. Calcutta, India: Calcutta University Press, 1927.
- Progress in International Organisation. Stanford, CA: Stanford University Press, 1932.
- By Pacific Means. New Haven, CT: Yale University Press, 1935.
- International Legislation (Carnegie Endowment for International Peace, 1937, co-edited with Ruth E. Bacon) and
- World Court Reports: A Collection of the Judgments, Orders and Opinions of the Permanent Court of International Justice. Volume III, 1932-1935 (Carnegie Endowment for International Peace, 1938, co-edited with Ruth E.Bacon)
- The Permanent Court of International Justice 1920-1942. New York: Macmillan, 1943.

Academic offices
Previous: Jens I. Westengard	Bemis Professor of International Law (1923–1954)	Next: Louis B. Sohn
