= Andreas Bummel =

German activist (born 1976)

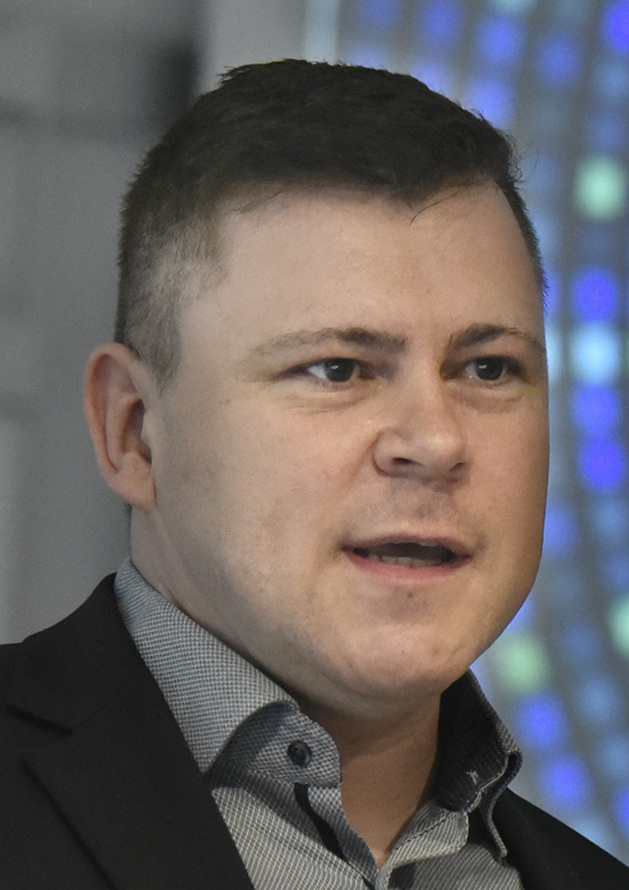
Andreas Bummel lecture "A World Parliament: Governance and Democracy in the 21st Century".

Andreas Bummel (*9. February 1976 in Cape Town) is co-founder and Executive Director of Democracy Without Borders and of the international campaign for a United Nations Parliamentary Assembly. He is also co-convenor of the "We The Peoples" campaign for inclusive global governance launched in 2019 which endorses a World Citizens' Initiative, among other things.

From 1998 to 2008 he was coordinator for UN reform issues of the Society for Threatened Peoples, one of Germany’s leading human rights organizations. He was a member of the Council of the World Federalist Movement-Institute for Global Policy in New York from 1998 to 2018, when the body was abolished. In 2015 the Society for Threatened Peoples awarded him the association’s honorary membership. Bummel is also member of the advisory board of the World Government Research Network.

A submission he made was a semi-finalist in the New Shape Prize in 2016 of the Global Challenges Foundation. In 2018, he authored a major book on the history, relevance and implementation of a world parliament (with co-author Jo Leinen) titled "A World Parliament: Governance and Democracy in the 21st Century". An updated and expanded edition of the book was published in 2024. In 2020, he spoke at the Athens Democracy Forum which was mentioned in The New York Times.

== Publications include ==
- Toward Global Political Integration: Time for a World Parliamentary Assembly, Great Transition Initiative, August 2016
- A World Parliament and the Transition from International Law to World Law, Cadmus Journal, Vol. 2, no. 3, October 2014
- A United Nations Parliamentary Assembly: A policy review of Democracy Without Borders, 2020
- Enhancing the Legitimacy of Multilateralism: Two Innovative Proposals for the UN. Policy Brief of the T20 engagement group of the G20, May 2023.
