= Shawsheen Cemetery =

Historic cemetery in Massachusetts, United States

Coordinates: 42°29′7.1″N 71°15′27.4″W

- U.S. National Register of Historic Places
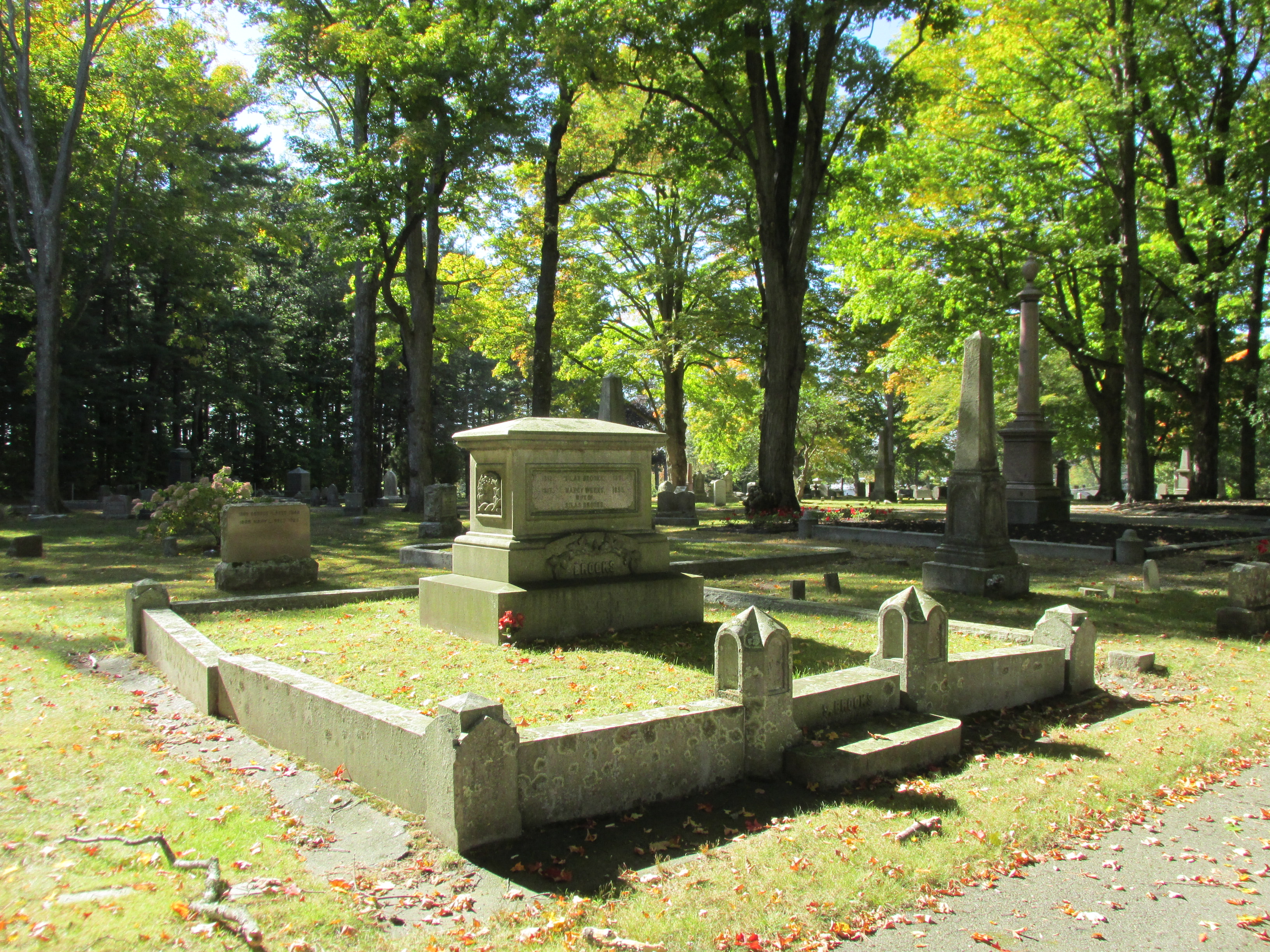
- Shawsheen Cemetery

- Location within Massachusetts Location within the United States
- Location: Bedford, Massachusetts
- Area: 16.87 acres (6.83 ha)
- Built: 1849
- NRHP reference No.: 07000547
- Added to NRHP: June 12, 2007

Shawsheen Cemetery is a historic cemetery on Great Road and Shawsheen Road in Bedford, Massachusetts. The cemetery is Bedford's second, opened in 1849 as its Old Burying Ground was filling up. The original ten acres, and a number of smaller additions between 1894 and 1959, were laid out in the rural cemetery style made fashionable in the 19th century. The total size of the cemetery is 44 acres (18 ha), but not all of this has been developed.

The older sections of the cemetery were listed on the National Register of Historic Places in 2007.

== Notable burials ==
- Dorothy Carolin Bacon (1902–1998) — American economist and college professor
- Ruth Elizabeth Bacon (1908–1985) — American foreign service officer
- Alexandra Carlisle (1886–1936) — American actress
- Charles H. Holbrow (1935–2023) — American physicist and college professor
- Charles Wilson Killam (1871–1961) — American architect, engineer, and professor at Harvard University
- Herman H. B. Meyer (1864–1937) — American librarian for the Library of Congress

== See also ==
- National Register of Historic Places listings in Middlesex County, Massachusetts
