= Democracy Without Borders =

International nongovernmental organization

- Abbreviation: DWB
- Formation: 2017
- Type: Nongovernmental organization
- Purpose: Advocates global democracy, global governance and global citizenship
- Headquarters: Berlin
- Location: International
- Executive Director: Andreas Bummel
- Affiliations: Campaign for a United Nations Parliamentary Assembly, Campaign for a UN World Citizens' Initiative
- Website: https://www.democracywithoutborders.org/

Democracy Without Borders, or DWB is an international nongovernmental organization established in 2017 with national chapters across the world and a legal seat in Berlin that promotes "global democracy, global governance and global citizenship". The organisation advocates "an integrated approach to democracy promotion that spans across all levels, from the local to the global and includes the dimensions of representation and participation." The organisation originates in what is now its German chapter which prior to March 2017 operated as Committee for a Democratic UN and was created in 2003.

== Goals ==
DWB's mission statement says that the organisation "strives for a democratic world order in which citizens participate beyond national boundaries in shaping policy that serves their joint long-term interests."

Specifically, it advocates the creation of a United Nations Parliamentary Assembly (UNPA), through "democratisation and reform of the United Nations and intergovernmental bodies in order to enable them to deal with transnational issues and threats successfully and on a legitimate basis." It seeks to achieve this through a gradual approach, starting first with forming the UNPA as a largely consultative body, before slowly empowering it as public support rises.

== Activities ==
DWB is a co-founder and coordinator of the Campaign for a United Nations Parliamentary Assembly; the latter has since gained support from over 1,500 members of parliament from around the world. In 2019, a Campaign for a UN World Citizens' Initiative was launched in collaboration with CIVICUS and Democracy International. In 2021, both campaigns were brought under the umbrella of the "We The Peoples" campaign for inclusive global governance that was endorsed by over 200 civil society groups and networks from across the world.

DWB also maintains a blog, which publishes a range of articles relating to global governance and the proliferation of democracy.

DWB is associated member of the World Federalist Movement/Institute for Global Policy.

The organisation and its activities have been mentioned or covered in articles and opinion pieces in The New York Times, IPS News, Al Jazeera, and other outlets across the world.

== National chapters ==
As of October 2022, DWB has national chapters in Germany, Greece, India, Kenya, Sweden, Switzerland, and the UK.

== See also ==
- Campaign for the Establishment of a United Nations Parliamentary Assembly
- United Nations Parliamentary Assembly
- World Federalist Movement/Institute for Global Policy
