= Louis B. Sohn =

Austrian-American legal scholar

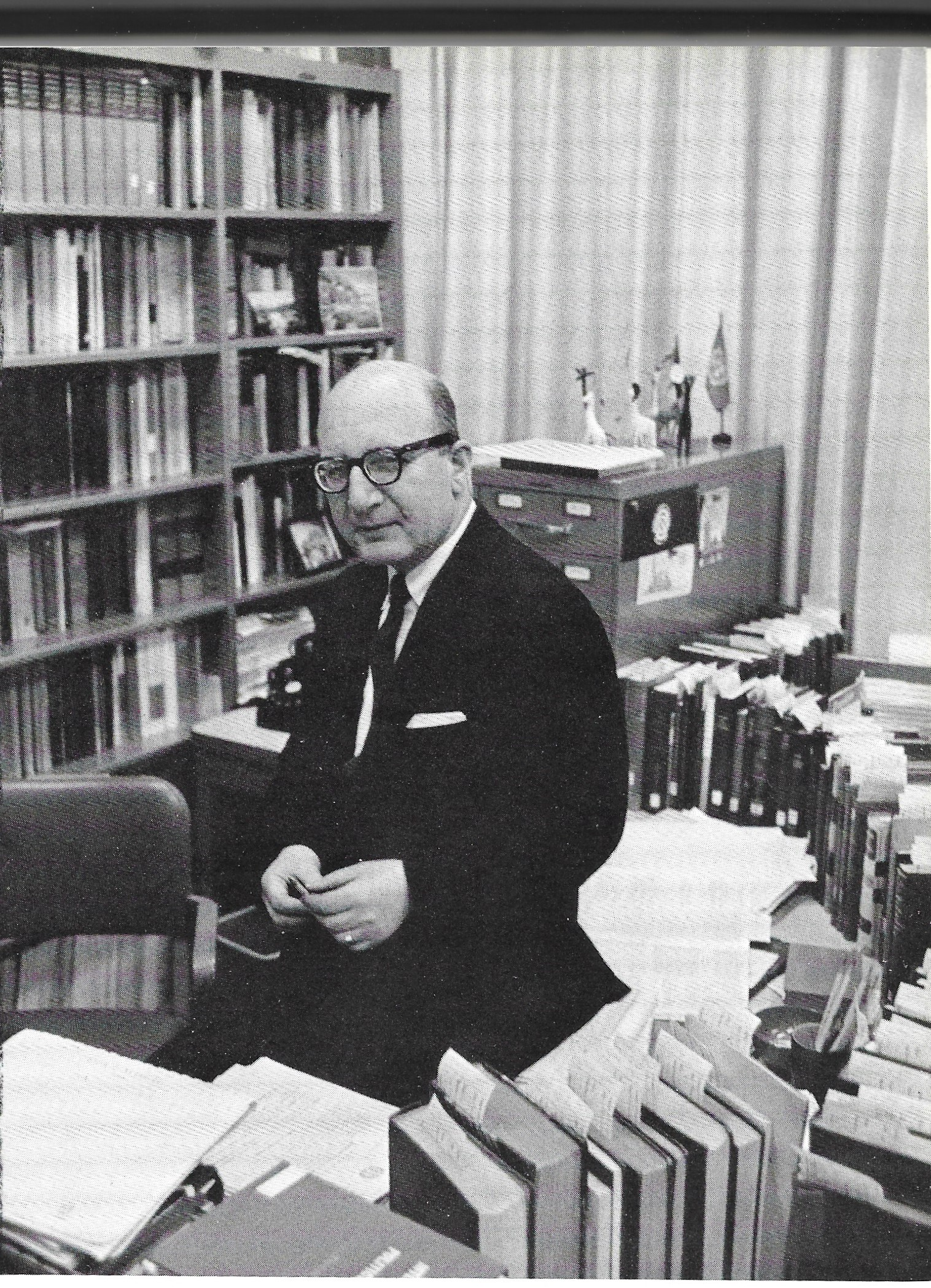
- Sohn in 1965
- Born: Ludwig Bruno Sohn; 1 March 1914; Lemberg, Austria-Hungary (now Ukraine)
- Died: 7 June 2006 (aged 92); Falls Church, Virginia, U.S.
- Education: University of Lviv (LLB); Harvard University (LLM, SJD)

Louis Bruno Sohn (1 March 1914 – 7 June 2006) was an Austrian-American legal scholar who was the Bemis Professor of International Law at Harvard Law School and the Woodruff Professor of International Law at University of Georgia.

== Biography ==
Sohn was born in Lemberg (now Lviv), in what was then Austria-Hungary, later Poland and now Ukraine, to a Polish-Jewish family. He earned his first law degree at John Casimir University in Lviv in 1939, leaving for the United States to take up a Harvard University research fellowship two weeks before Nazi Germany invaded Poland. He was a longtime scholar of international law and advocate of international institutions.

As a protégé of Manley O. Hudson, he participated in the San Francisco Conference that established the United Nations, working on the statute of the International Court of Justice. Sohn earned his LL.M. and S.J.D. degrees from Harvard Law School. He was appointed an assistant professor there in 1951, succeeding Hudson to the Bemis Chair in 1961. Upon retirement from Harvard, Sohn followed his friend Dean Rusk to the University of Georgia School of Law, where he held the Woodruff Chair in International Law until 1991.

Sohn served as counselor to the Legal Adviser, U.S. Department of State in 1970 and 1971. He was the U.S. delegate to the Law of the Sea Convention from 1974 to 1982.

In 1958, Sohn was a co-author, with Grenville Clark, of World Peace Through World Law (Harvard University Press), which examined proposals to transform the United Nations into a world government. The book called for complete disarmament and the use of world judicial tribunals to solve international disputes. The plan also proposed a permanent world police force to enforce a prohibition on the use of force by states.

He was nominated for the Nobel Peace Prize by numerous people from 1959 to 1964.

Upon Sohn's death in 2006, UN Secretary General Kofi Annan issued a statement noting Sohn's reputation as "a voice of reason and source of wisdom," and celebrating his "firm belie[f] in the importance of the United Nations and of the rule of law in settling international disputes."

== See also ==
- Vicente Blanco Gaspar

== Notes ==
Academic offices
Previous: Manley O. Hudson	Bemis Professor of International Law (1961–1981)	Next: Detlev F. Vagts
