= Chapter IV of the United Nations Charter =

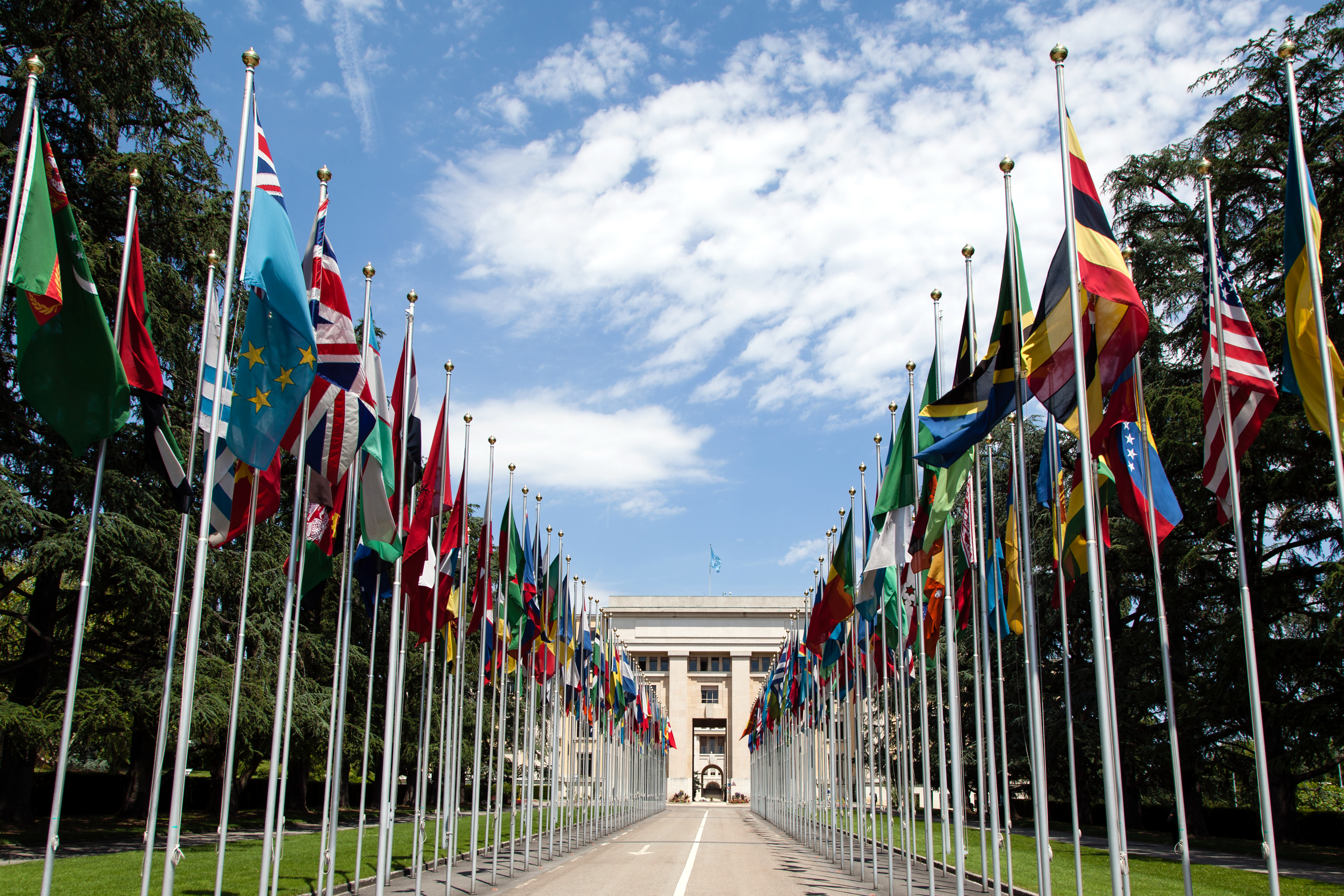
The United Nations Office at Geneva (Switzerland) is the second biggest UN centre, after the United Nations Headquarters (New York City)

Chapter IV of the United Nations Charter contains the Charter's provisions dealing with the UN General Assembly (UNGA), specifically its composition, functions, powers, and procedures.

== Primacy of the General Assembly ==
The chapter on the UNGA appears in the Charter before the chapters on the other five principal organs (Security Council, Economic and Social Council, Trusteeship Council, International Court of Justice, and Secretariat). This reflects the UN founders’ view of the UNGA as the "first" branch of the UN, in much the same way that the placement of the provisions related to the United States Congress in Article I of the United States Constitution before those dealing with the president and United States Supreme Court reflects the Philadelphia Convention's view of Congress as the "first branch" of the U.S. government. Both Congress and General Assembly hold the "power of the purse" in regard to their respective organizations. No doubt, the UNGA also appears first because most decisions (except those dealing with security matters) mentioned later in the Charter require General Assembly assent, and the UNGA appoints:

- 10 of the 15 members of the Security Council;
- All of the members of ECOSOC;
- As many as half the members of the Trusteeship Council;
- All of the judges of the International Court of Justice (with Security Council assent); and
- The Secretary-General (upon the Security Council's nomination).

Article 9 guarantees each member country a seat in the UNGA, making it the only UN body with universal membership.

== Articles 10, 11, 12, 13, 14, 15 and 16 ==
Article 10 gives the UNGA power to "discuss any questions or any matters within the scope of the present Charter or relating to the powers and functions of any organs provided for in the present Charter" and to make recommendations on those subjects. This, along with the Article 15 provision requiring the Security Council (UNSC) and other organs to issue reports of their activities to the UNGA, essentially puts the UNGA in the role of overseer over the other UN bodies (there is no reciprocal provision by which the UNGA or other bodies make recommendations as to the powers and functions of the UNGA).

Article 11 tasks the UNGA with considering "principles governing disarmament and the regulation of armaments" and making recommendations on the same to the UNGA, which under Chapter V has the responsibility of making more detailed plans in reference to disarmament.

The UNGA is prohibited by Article 12 from making recommendations on matters currently being dealt with by the UNSC unless requested to do so by the council. However, this has not always prevented the General Assembly from attempting to deal with threats to international peace and security, in cases where the Security Council was deadlocked, by using the framework of the Uniting for Peace resolution (A/RES/377 A).

Article 13 tasks the UNGA with initiating studies and making recommendations for "promoting international co-operation in the political field and encouraging the progressive development of international law and its codification”. This provides a clue as to the founders' hopes that the UN as formulated by the original Charter would be a first step toward a much more comprehensive framework of international law, whose development would be coordinated by the General Assembly.

Article 16 grants the UNGA limited power over the trusteeship system.

== Article 17 ==
Article 17 provides that "The General Assembly shall consider and approve the budget of the Organization." The interpretation of section 2 is controversial. It reads:

2. The expenses of the Organization shall be borne by the Members as apportioned by the General Assembly.

When the United States fell behind in paying its dues to the UN, some members held that the U.S. was breaking its treaty obligations to bear the expenses of the Organization. In 1995, Malaysia said that any unilateral decision to reduce UN assessments is "illegal and totally unacceptable" and Australia said it "would not accept" a situation whereby "the largest contributor, by its failure to comply with the Charter, would destabilize the operation of the UN". Another interpretation, advanced by the Cato Institute, is that "the intent is to make certain that the world body is financed by countries, not special interests outside the organization".

== Article 18 ==
Article 18 gives each state one vote in the UNGA. The interpretation of Sections 2 and 3 is controversial. They read:

2. Decisions of the General Assembly on important questions shall be made by a two-thirds majority of the members present and voting. These questions shall include recommendations with respect to the maintenance of international peace and security, the election of the non-permanent members of the Security Council, the election of the members of the Economic and Social Council, the election of members of the Trusteeship Council in accordance with paragraph 1 (c) of Article 86, the admission of new Members to the United Nations, the suspension of the rights and privileges of membership, the expulsion of Members, questions relating to the operation of the trusteeship system, and budgetary questions.
3. Decisions on other questions, including the determination of additional categories of questions to be decided by a two-thirds majority, shall be made by a majority of the members present and voting.

The question of what constitutes an "important question" arose during the discussion of United Nations General Assembly Resolution 2758, which expelled the Taiwanese delegation from the UN and replaced it with the People's Republic of China. The General Assembly had declared, by a vote of 59 to 55 with 15 abstentions, this to be an unimportant question that did not require the consent of two-thirds of the members. The delegates of the Republic of China protested that this decision was illegal, and subsequently left the assembly hall.

Article 18 was designed to provide a more workable system than that established by Article 5 of the Covenant of the League of Nations, which provided for a consensus-based system in which "decisions at any meeting of the Assembly or of the Council shall require the agreement of all the Members of the League represented at the meeting."

== Article 19 ==
Article 19 provides that any country that falls two years behind in its dues will lose its vote in the General Assembly. The United States, when it was withholding dues in protest over the slow pace of United Nations reform, has historically paid just enough at the end of each year to avoid losing its vote under this provision.

Rule 161 of the rules of procedure of the General Assembly states that the Committee on Contributions shall "advise the General Assembly … on the action to be taken with regard to the application of Article 19 of the Charter".

According to the New York Times, "The fact that a member is in arrears and thus not entitled to vote is, by established practice, determined by the Secretary-General through computation and reported to the Assembly by him or by the Committee on Contributions. Comparable situations in specialized agencies of the United Nations have shown that a member's loss of voting rights is mandatory and automatic and that the fact of his debt is a 'ministerial, mathematical calculation' rather than a political decision”.

After a World Court ruling in the Certain Expenses case made it clear that Soviet and Soviet bloc countries, France, and Latin American countries had defaulted on peacekeeping debts, during the 19th session (1964-1965), no votes at all were taken in the General Assembly. It was ultimately decided to ignore that default rather than take away those countries' vote in the General Assembly. U.S. Ambassador Arthur Goldberg declared that "it is not in the world interest to have the work of the General Assembly immobilized in these troubled days”.

In 1963, an announcement of Haiti's arrears by the president of the General Assembly at the opening plenary meeting was considered unnecessary because a formal vote count in the presence of a representative of Haiti did not take place.

Circa 1969, the government of Haiti claimed it was unable to pay its dues due to cyclones Betty, Flora, and Ines, which over a period of seven years destroyed half its agriculture, its livestock, and its light industry. Haiti also cited the negative effects on tourism of invasions such as the 20 May 1968 invasion.

As of late April 1998, 29 UN member countries were in arrears by more than their preceding two years' assessments and thus were ineligible to vote in the General Assembly. In 1999, faced with the possibility of Article 19 sanctions, President Bill Clinton agreed to withhold funding from organizations that supported abortion in exchange for Congress's agreement to repay U.S. arrears to the UN.

In June 2021 Iran briefly lost voting rights due to non-payment, which Iran attributed to U.S. sanctions. Shortly after the loss of voting rights was announced negotiations with the United States led to money being released to pay the arrears and thus restore voting rights.

== Article 22 ==
Article 22 allows the UN to establish subsidiary bodies. This has been the basis for proposals to establish a United Nations Parliamentary Assembly without formal amendment of the UN Charter.
