= Michael Goodhart =

American political scientist

Michael Goodhart is a political scientist and Professor of Political Science and of Gender, Sexuality, and Women's Studies at the University of Pittsburgh. He was Director of Pitt's Global Studies Center from 2017 to 2021. In 2021–2022, Goodhart was a Fellow at the Swedish Collegium for Advanced Study in Uppsala, Sweden. In 2026, he delivered the 8th Wittrock Lecture at the same institution.

== Works ==
- Goodhart, Michael E. (2005). Democracy as Human Rights: Freedom and Equality in the Age of Globalization. Routledge. ISBN 978-0-415-95177-7.
- Goodhart, Michael E. (2018). Injustice: Political Theory for the Real World. Oxford University Press. ISBN 978-0-19-069242-1.
