= World Peace Through World Law =

1958 international law book by Sohn and Clark

- Title page for World Peace Through World Law (1958)
- Author: Louis B. Sohn, Grenville Clark
- Publisher: Harvard University Press
- Publication date: 1958
- Pages: 540

World Peace Through World Law was a book by Louis B. Sohn and Grenville Clark in 1958 that proposed a Revised United Nations Charter. Some of their suggestions included the following:

- Allocating votes in the UN General Assembly based on the populations of member nations;
- Replacing the UN Security Council with an Executive Council with China, India, USSR, and the U.S. as permanent members, and no veto power; and
- Making a World Police Force that would become the only military force permitted in the world.

== Cultural references ==
In one passage of Rex Stout's 1959 detective novel Champagne for One, the character Nero Wolfe is described as sitting behind his desk reading World Peace Through World Law. Wolfe is greatly impressed with the book, to the point of forgetting the current mystery he is involved in solving, and suggests to his colleague Archie Goodwin that he must read it too (ch. VII).
