= Citizens for a United Nations People's Assembly =

Organization advocating reform of the United Nations

Citizens for a United Nations People's Assembly is an organization seeking reform of the United Nations through its "Campaign to Empower the UN". A major goal of the group is the establishment of a United Nations Parliamentary Assembly. It has gathered hundreds of signatures, including the endorsements of high-profile nongovernmental organizations, on an open letter to Kofi Annan asking him to "convene a High Level Panel to determine the steps required for the establishment of a Peoples' Parliamentary Assembly within the United Nations Organization."

== See also ==
- United Nations Parliamentary Assembly
