= World Federalist Movement/Institute for Global Policy =

Movement advocating world institutions

- World Federalist Movement/Institute for Global Policy, Ltd.
- Abbreviation: WFM/IGP
- Formation: 1947
- Type: NGO
- Purpose: International relations, world federalism, international democracy, world government
- Website: wfm-igp.org
- Formerly called: World Federalist Movement

The World Federalist Movement/Institute for Global Policy, Ltd. is an organization that advocates for a democratic world government of a world federalist system, formed in 1947 in Montreux, Switzerland.

== History ==
In 1947, five small world federalist organizations came together in Asheville, North Carolina and agreed to merge as the United World Federalists. These five groups had, in the previous year, met with representatives of fifteen others in Bern and Hertenstein (Weggis) to discuss creating a worldwide federalist organization. It was one year later, in August 1947, in Montreux, that more than 51 organizations from 24 countries came together at the Conference of the World Movement for World Federal Government (WMWFG). The Conference concluded with the Montreux Declaration.

By its second congress in 1948 in Luxembourg, the Movement consisted of 150,000 members of 19 nationalities and 50 member and affiliated organizations. The 350 participants in the Congress laid the groundwork for an association of parliamentarians for world government, which came into being in 1951.

== Structure ==
The World Federalist Movement-Institute for Global Policy serves as a New York hub and secretariat for world federalist organizations.

WFM/IGP is composed of autonomous national and regional organizations organized by individual supporters in their respective countries. In applying to the governing Council for membership, organizations are asked to endorse the "Statutes of the World Federalist Movement" and to demonstrate a "capacity to contribute to the enhancement of public and political support" for the Movement's goals.

WFM/IGP member organizations exist around the world, including Citizens for Global Solutions, Union of European Federalists, World Federalist Movement-Canada, and the World Federalist Movement of Japan. Others include the Young World Federalists, the Democratic World Federalists, One World Trust, Democracy Without Borders, and the Ugandan World Federalists. The WFM umbrella organization also includes the Coalition for the International Criminal Court and the International Coalition for the Responsibility to Protect.

== See also ==
- World Federalism
- United Nations Parliamentary Assembly
- World Federalist Movement-Canada
- Italian Unionist Movement
