= Cosmopolitan democracy =

Political theory of global governance

Cosmopolitan democracy is a political theory which explores the application of norms and values of democracy at the transnational and global sphere. It argues that global governance of the people, by the people, for the people is possible and needed. Writers advocating cosmopolitan democracy include Immanuel Kant, David Held, Daniele Archibugi, Richard Falk, and Mary Kaldor. In the cosmopolitan democracy model, decisions are made by those affected, avoiding a single hierarchical form of authority. According to the nature of the issues at stake, democratic practice should be reinvented to take into account the will of stakeholders. This can be done either through direct participation or through elected representatives. The model advocated by cosmopolitan democrats is confederal and decentralized—global governance without world government—unlike those models of global governance supported by classic World Federalism thinkers, such as Albert Einstein.

In 2021, a global citizen's assembly was organised to coincide with COP26 in Glasgow in October–November 2021. This is the first body that can claim to democratically represent the wishes of the global population.

== Origin and development ==
The victory of Western liberal states ending the Cold War inspired the hope that international relations could be guided by the ideals of democracy and the rule of law. In the early 1990s, a group of thinkers developed the political project of cosmopolitan democracy with the aim of providing intellectual arguments in favour of an expansion of democracy, both within states and at the global level. While some significant successes have been achieved in terms of democratization within states, much less has been attained in democratizing the global system.

In different forms, the necessity to expand democratic procedures beyond the nation-state has been supported by political philosopher Jürgen Habermas, and sociologist Ulrich Beck.

Criticisms of cosmopolitan democracy have come from realist, marxist, communitarian and multicultural perspectives. Democratic theorist Robert Dahl has expressed his doubts about the possibility of expanding democracy in international organizations to any significant degree, as he believes that democratic agency diminishes with size.

== Political programme ==
The idea of cosmopolitan democracy has been advocated with reference to the reform of international organizations. This includes the institution of the International Criminal Court, a directly elected World Parliament or world assembly of governments, and more widely the democratization of international organizations. Supporters of cosmopolitan democracy have been sceptical about the effectiveness of military interventions, even when they are apparently motivated by humanitarian intentions. They have instead suggested popular diplomacy and arms control.

According to a 2019 study, global democracy would neither lead to an increase in dissatisfaction with policy outcomes nor an increase in persistent minorities relative to the status quo.

== See also ==
- Cosmopolitanism
- Democratic mundialization
- United Nations Parliamentary Assembly
- World government
