= Theta Tau =

American engineering fraternity

- ΘΤ
- Founded: October 15, 1904; 122 years ago University of Minnesota
- Type: Professional
- Affiliation: PFA
- Former affiliation: PIC
- Status: Active
- Emphasis: Engineering
- Scope: International
- Motto: "Whatsoever thy hand findeth to do, do it with thy might"
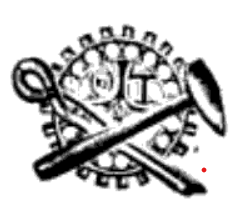
- Member badge
- Colors: Dark Red and Gold
- Symbol: Hammer and Tongs, Gear
- Flower: Jacqueminot
- Jewel: Dark Red Garnet
- Publication: The Gear of Theta Tau
- Chapters: 99
- Colonies: 4
- Members: 5,000+ active 50,000+ lifetime
- Headquarters: 2131 W. Republic Road #528; Springfield, Missouri 65807; United States
- Website: thetatau.org

Theta Tau (ΘΤ) is a professional collegiate engineering fraternity. The fraternity has programs to promote the social, academic, and professional development of its members. Theta Tau is the oldest and largest professional engineering fraternity and has a membership of more than 60,000 men and women who study engineering in all its various branches on over 100 college campuses.

The Theta Tau Central Office is located in Springfield, Missouri.

== History ==
=== Founding years (1904–1911) ===
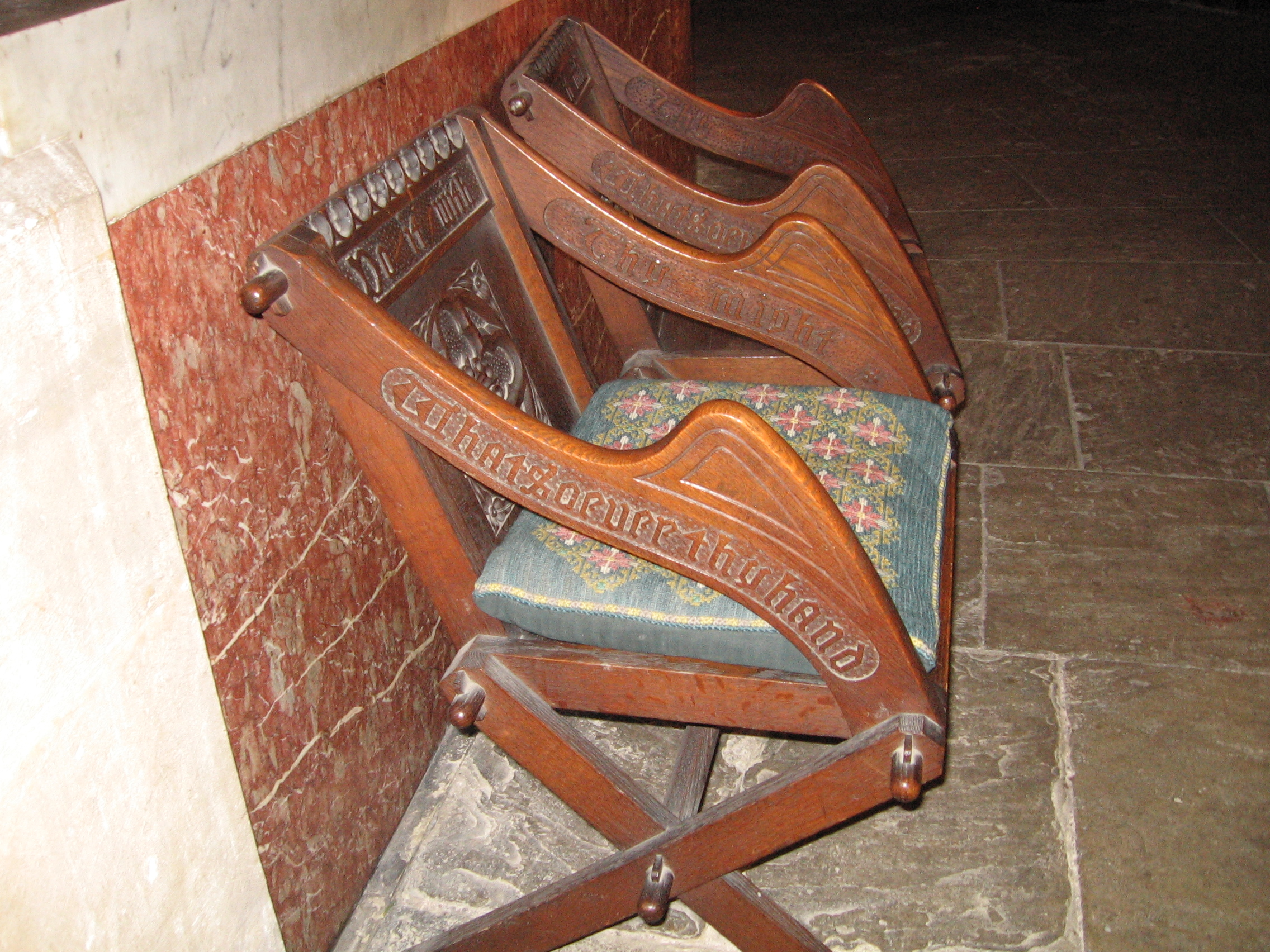
Ecc. 9:10 chairs in Irish Cathedral

Theta Tau was founded by four engineering students at the University of Minnesota in Minneapolis, Minnesota as the Society of Hammer and Tongs on October 15, 1904. Its founders were Erich J. Schrader, Elwin L. Vinal, William M. Lewis, and Isaac B. Hanks, who were all mining engineering students. They agreed that character qualification should have top priority in membership selection.

Schrader served as its first Grand Regent and was chiefly responsible for the ritual, constitution, and bylaws adopted by the founders. He created one of the original artifacts of incorporation for the Society of Hammer and Tongs, the bolt of "strength and unity" in late 1904.

The constitution provided for the establishment of additional chapters at other leading engineering schools, and the fraternity soon began to expand nationally. Hanks spoke of the fraternity to his friend, Robert Downing, a member of the Rhombohedron Club at Michigan College of Mines. After correspondence and an inspection trip by Hanks, the club was installed as Beta chapter in 1906. Lewis transferred to the Colorado School of Mines and contacted the Square Set Club, which became the Gamma chapter in 1907. The Southwestern Alumni Association, the fraternity's first, was established in Douglas, Arizona, in 1908.

In 1911, representatives of the three chapters and the alumni association met at the University of Minnesota for the first national convention. The name was changed to Theta Tau, a revised ritual was approved, and the present badge was adopted. Perhaps most important for its future expansion, they decided that Theta Tau would include all branches of engineering.

=== Pre-World War II growth (1911–1935) ===
In the next two years, Delta, Epsilon, Zeta, and Eta chapters were installed. The second convention was held in Houghton, Michigan, in 1913. That convention designated The Gear of Theta Tau as the national fraternity's magazine and appointed Jack E. Haynes, A '08, as its first editor-in-chief. Previously, the magazine had been published by Beta chapter with Herman H. Hopkins, B '08, as editor. Hopkins, a member of the Rhombohedron Club, had been initiated by Beta chapter as an alumnus. He served until 1919 as the Grand Scribe and later (1935) was elected Grand Regent.

The third (1915) and fourth (1919) conventions were held in Cleveland, Ohio. Meanwhile, Theta, Iota, and Kappa chapters were installed. Elected as Grand Regent in 1919 was Dr. George D. Louderback, E '96, a charter member of the Epsilon chapter. During his tenure, rapid growth continued, with nine more chapters being installed. In 1920, Schrader became the Grand Scribe, serving in this capacity for 35 years.

J. Sidney Marine, H '21, was elected Grand Regent in 1925, the youngest to serve in that position. In 1926, Donald D. Curtis, O Hon. '19, was appointed editor. Three more chapters were installed during the terms of Grand Regent Dr. Richard J. Russell, E '19. He designed and issued the first 5,000 membership certificates and also designed the officer robes. Joseph W. Howe, O '24, and Paul L. Mercer, O '21, became editors of The Gear in 1929, producing the publication for 32 years.

Fred Coffman, L '22, served as Grand Regent during the depression years through 1935. Despite the conditions, three more chapters were installed. A period of very conservative extension began during the thirties with charters generally being granted only to petitioning long-established locals.

=== World War II history (1935–1944) ===
Regional Conferences were established during Hopkins' term as Grand Regent (1935–37). Dr. John M. Daniels, N Hon. '22, was the last to serve out his term as Grand Regent in the pre-World War II period. At the 1939 convention, Russell G. Glass, S '24, was elected Grand Regent and reelected in 1941. At the 1941 Convention, Theta Tau began a tradition of honoring a student chapter delegate as the convention's "Outstanding Delegate."

During World War II, conventions were discontinued and chapters decreased in size, but few went inactive. Hopkins was named Acting Grand Regent for the 27 months that Glass served abroad in the Navy. When conventions were resumed in 1946, Ralph W. Nusser, Z '28, was elected Grand Regent. During his term, the chapters grew unusually large due to the influx of returning veterans. Norman B. Ames, GB '17, was elected Grand Regent in 1948.

=== Post World War II (1944–1962) ===
Donald D. Curtis, who a few months after his initiation into the fraternity had been appointed Editor in 1926, added to his years of continuous service as a national officer and began his term as Grand Regent in 1950. Another longtime officer, Jamison Vawter, Z '16, was elected Grand Regent for the term concluding Theta Tau's first half-century. He had served for 27 years as Grand Treasurer and was honored by being the first for whom a Theta Tau Convention was named (1935).

The Founders' Golden Anniversary Convention was held in Minneapolis and was scheduled to include Founders' Day. It was a gala occasion marred only by the absence of founder Schrader and Editor Howe due to illness. It was attended by founders Lewis and Vinal and by many Past Grand Regents, including brother Louderback.

Donald D. Curtis served as Grand Regent from 1950 to 1952. A. Dexter Hinckley, T '25, was elected Grand Regent at the 1954 Convention. Norman B. Ames succeed Schrader as Grand Scribe but resigned to accept a Fulbright Lectureship in Ceylon (now Sri Lanka). At its Founders' Golden Anniversary Convention in 1954, Theta Tau established the position of Counselor which only Schrader could hold. He continued to serve until he died in 1962. The position of Regional Director was established by the 1956 Convention.

At the 1958 Convention, Charles W. Britzius, A '33, was elected Grand Regent, the restriction of membership to those who were white was removed, and the fraternity appropriated funds to support extension efforts. Robert E. Pope, Z '52, was appointed Grand Scribe in April 1956 to succeed Ames, was repeatedly elected to that office for 38 years, and was first employed by the fraternity as the traveling secretary in October 1959. William E. Franklin, Z '57, was appointed editor-in-chief of The Gear in 1961, succeeding Howe and Mercer. He served until 1969.

=== Vietnam years (1962–1976) ===
At the convention in 1962, William K. Rey, M '45, was elected Grand Regent, and the fraternity established the position of executive secretary (now executive director) to which Pope was appointed. In 1963, for the first time, the fraternity had a central office. Britzius, retiring as Grand Regent, was elected Grand Treasurer, a position he was to hold for twelve years. The decade of the 1960s was one of moderate growth with seven new chapters installed. Annual alumni gifts were first solicited in 1964.

The convention in 1964 adopted the colony program as the standard route which a local fraternity would follow in becoming a Theta Tau chapter. It also adopted the official flag featuring four quadrants.

The 1966 convention elected C. Ramond Hanes, S 1924, as Grand Regent. The 1968 convention elected Dr. Charles E. Wales, EB '53, as Grand Regent. The position of a student member of the executive council was created in 1970.

The Executive Council Bulletin, in newsletter format, was first published during the 1970–72 biennium. Now generally issued monthly during the school year, it provides timely news and reminders to officers of the national fraternity, chapters, and alumni organizations.

Dr. George G. Dodd, Z '60, was elected Grand Regent in 1972; and the delegate-at-large (immediate Past Grand Regent) was made an official member of the executive council. The 1976 convention elected Grand Regent Stephen J. Barth, LB '67. In 1977, a plan adopted by the 1976 convention was implemented, making women eligible for membership with the Delta chapter at Case Western Reserve University, being one of the first to admit women.

=== A new era (1976–1991) ===
Richard A. Rummelhart, O '76, was appointed editor in 1978 and was succeeded by Arthur T. Petrzelka, O '79, who edited the magazine from 1979 to 1988. The first membership directory in forty years was published in 1979, and others in 1985, 1990, and 1994. A History of Theta Tau, compiled by Past Grand Regent Charles W. Britzius, was published in 1980. Regional conferences were replaced by a special convention in 1981, establishing the pattern of holding national meetings annually in August rather than biennially in the week after Christmas.

In 1982, A. Thomas Brown was elected Grand Regent. In 1983, Theta Tau moved the central office from the executive secretary's home to space in the Theta Xi Memorial Headquarters Building in Creve Coeur; held its first national conference; and first employed a second member, Dean W. Bettinger, T '81, as extension director/chapter consultant. Since then, others have been employed for limited periods, including Michael T. Abraham, EB '92, who served as an administrative assistant in 1988 and briefly in 1989.

The Theta Tau Alumni Hall of Fame was established in 1986 to honor members who distinguish themselves through the excellence of their contributions to their professions and/or to the fraternity. Randall J. Scheetz, O '79, was first elected Grand Regent in 1986. The fraternity experienced significant growth during his tenure with the installation of eight chapters and the certification of thirteen colonies. This extension effort was sparked by Jerome R. Palardy, EB '90, then a student member of the executive council in the Detroit area. The result was Xi Beta, Omicron Beta, and Phi Beta chapters. Pi and Gamma Beta chapters were re-established after being inactive since the late 1970s. Pi Beta, Rho Beta, Sigma Beta, and Tau Beta chapters were installed and four new alumni clubs were authorized.

The Rube Goldberg Machine Contest originated at Purdue University in 1949 as a competition between the Phi chapter of Theta Tau and Triangle; it was held annually until 1956. Phi chapter revived the contest in 1983 as a competition open to all Purdue students. From 1988 to 2013, the Theta Tau Rube Goldberg Machine Contest was a national competition held at Purdue University in March each year, with participation by winning entries from local competitions sponsored by Theta Tau chapters across the nation. The national contest gained much coverage by the press and television media.

Sean Donnelly, T'88, and Lawrence El-Hindi, T '87, were appointed co-editors-in-chief of The Gear of Theta Tau in 1988. At the direction of the executive council, the central office staff assumed responsibility for the regular publication of the magazine beginning with the spring 1994 issue. Dean W. Bettinger, who had served as a staff member in 1983, was first elected Grand Regent at the 1990 convention and was reelected in 1992 and 1994. During his tenure, nine chapters were installed: Upsilon Beta, Phi Beta, Chi Beta, Psi Beta, Tau (reestablished), Omega Beta, Delta Gamma, Epsilon Gamma, and Zeta Gamma; and six colonies certified.

The Theta Tau Outstanding Student Member Program was created in 1991 so each chapter could designate an outstanding student member for recognition by the national fraternity. The national fraternity gives recipients an engrossed certificate and an award dangle which the recipient displays on their badge's guard chain. One of these each year is selected as the fraternity's Outstanding Student Member with the announcement made at the national meeting. The national honoree is presented with a special certificate and with a jeweled dangle.

=== The present-day (1991-present) ===
In 1991, the central office moved to the 655 Office Building in the Creve Coeur Executive Office Park. Michael T. Abraham returned as a permanent staff member with the title of assistant executive director in 1992 and was elected Grand Scribe in 1994. In 1994, the appointive position of executive director was added to the executive council. Pope, who had served on staff for 37 years, retired in 1996 and was designated executive director emeritus by the executive council. Abraham was appointed executive director.

Lee C. Haas was elected Grand Regent in 1996 and reelected in 1998. He was instrumental in establishing the Theta Tau Educational Foundation in 1998 and served as its first president. In 1999, the foundation sponsored the fraternity's first Leadership Academy which replaced the National Conference. Haas presided at the installation of Eta Gamma, Theta Gamma, and Iota Gamma chapters.

At the fraternity's first convention held in Arizona, Glen A. Wilcox was elected Grand Regent. At the 2000 meeting, many structural changes were made in the constitution and bylaws to more fully integrate the central office into the laws. These changes reflected many practices already in place and allowed the executive council to focus on its responsibilities as the fraternity's board of directors. The convention also endorsed the national fraternity liability insurance standard adopted by the executive council in the spring of 1999.

In 2000, past Grand Regent Haas presided at the installation of the Kappa Gamma chapter at the Virginia Commonwealth University. Grand Regent Wilcox presided at the installation of Lambda Gamma at Clemson University on January 13, 2001, and he later presided at the installations of Mu Gamma and Nu Gamma in the spring of 2003. In November 2001, the central office moved from the St. Louis metropolitan area to Austin, Texas, and the fraternity's archives were moved from a room in the Alpha chapter house to the central office.

As the fraternity reached its centennial in 2004, Theta Tau had initiated over 30,000 members and had more active student chapters than at any time in its history. At the 2004 convention, Michael D. Livingston was elected Grand Regent. During his term, Omicron Gamma, Pi Gamma, Rho Gamma, Sigma Gamma, Tau Gamma, Upsilon Gamma, Phi Gamma, Chi Gamma, Psi Gamma, Omega Gamma, Zeta Delta, Eta Delta, Theta Delta, Iota Delta, Epsilon Delta and Pi Delta chapters were installed. Additionally, Kappa, and Epsilon were re-installed.

In 2007, the central office moved from leased office space to its first fraternity-owned headquarters. The roughly 1,500-square-foot (140 m^{2}) office condo was located at the corner of 11th and San Jacinto, within blocks of the capitol and university in downtown Austin, Texas. In the same year, the National Alumni Club of Theta Tau was created.

In the spring of 2010, Grand Marshal Brandon Satterwhite led a group of students and alumni on the fraternity's first national service project with the Habitat for Humanity chapter in Flagler Beach, Florida. Brother Satterwhite has continued that tradition every year since and expanded the national Habitat for Humanity project to also include a week in Ventura County, California and up to three weeks at Flagler Beach.

In 2025, the fraternity become international with the formation of the first group at the University of Manchester in England, United Kingdom with efforts led by undergraduate Andrew W. Fretwell. There are ongoing efforts to continue this momentum in the United Kingdom with additional groups forming.

== Symbols ==
The primary symbols of Theta Tau are the Hammer and Tongs, and the gear wheel. One of the fraternity's original artifacts of incorporation is the bolt of "strength and unity", fabricated by Schrader in 1904. Made of brass and painted the historic dark red found in the official crest, this bolt has survived almost unscathed over the years.

The flag of Theta Tau is broken into four quadrants, alternately colored dark red and gold. In the upper left corner is the crest of Theta Tau. In the opposing corner are Greek letters ΘΤ in gold. There is also an alternate flag that is divided along its length into three equal sections, the left and right dark red with gold in the center bearing dark red letters Θ and Τ arranged vertically. The letters ΘΤ in dark red are found in the center section.

The fraternity's colors are dark red and gold, while its gem is dark red garnet. The more common pyrope garnet, used in the member's badge, is used based on color and availability. The oldest symbol of the fraternity still in use is the coat of arms adopted in 1906. It may only be displayed or worn by members.

The first badge was a gold skull with the letters Θ and Τ on its forehead and a crossed hammer and tongs beneath, but this was replaced in 1911. The four items of official jewelry remain the member's badge, gear pin (called the sister pin until 1994), pledge insignia, and official recognition button. Other insignia have been adopted over the years. The colony program sparked the design of the simple colony pin and colony pledge pin.

The fraternity's open motto is "Whatsoever thy hand findeth to do, do it with thy might;..." – Ecclesiastes 9:10

== Conferences ==
Number-Name	Year	Location	Named to Honor	Outstanding Delegate	Schrader Award	Founders' Award	Grand Regents Award	Notes	References
1st	1911	Minneapolis, Minnesota			N/A	N/A	N/A	Name was changed to Theta Tau; Decided to include all branches of engineering	
2nd	1913	Houghton, Michigan			N/A	N/A	N/A	Designated The Gear of Theta Tau as the national magazine	
3rd	1915	Cleveland, Ohio			N/A	N/A	N/A		
4th	1919	Cleveland, Ohio			N/A	N/A	N/A		
5th	1921	Lawrence, Kansas			N/A	N/A	N/A		
6th	1923	Iowa City, Iowa			N/A	N/A	N/A		
7th	1925	Columbus, Ohio			N/A	N/A	N/A		
8th	1927	Chicago, Illinois			N/A	N/A	N/A		
9th	1929	Minneapolis, Minnesota			N/A	N/A	N/A		
10th	1931	Fayetteville, Arkansas			N/A	N/A	N/A		
11th	1933	Chicago, Illinois			N/A	N/A	N/A		
12th	1935	Kansas City, Missouri	Jamison Vawter		N/A	N/A	N/A		
13th	1937	Chicago, Illinois	H. H. Hopkins		N/A	N/A	N/A		
14th	1939	Chicago, Illinois			Pi	N/A	N/A		
15th	1941	St. Louis, Missouri		Max D. Crittenden	Beta	N/A	N/A		
16th	1946	Louisville, Kentucky	John M. Daniels	William L. Sparks	Mu	N/A	N/A		
17th	1948	Chicago, Illinois	Russell G. Glass	Donald D. Blanchard	Beta	N/A	N/A		
18th	1950	Kansas City, Missouri	Ralph Nusser	Thomas E. Mutchler	Upsilon	N/A	N/A		
19th	1952	West Lafayette, Indiana	Norman B. Ames	Peter A. Minderman	Sigma	N/A	N/A		
20th	1954	Minneapolis, Minnesota	Founders	Robert E. Pope	Beta	N/A	N/A		
21st	1956	Columbus, Ohio	Donald D. Curtis	John M. Dealy	Chi	N/A	N/A		
22nd	1958	Madison, Wisconsin	George Louderback	George G. Dodd Raymond J. Sullivan	Zeta	N/A	N/A	Granted membership eligibility to non-white men	
23rd	1960	Detroit, Michigan	Erich J. Schrader	Jack A. Grimmett	Zeta	N/A	N/A		
24th	1962	Louisville, Kentucky	Paul L. Mercer	Michael D. Martin	Omicron	N/A	N/A		
25th	1964	Columbus, Ohio	A. Dexter Hinckley	John E. Daniel	Phi	N/A	N/A	Geology removed from the list of majors eligible for membership	
26th	1966	Minneapolis, Minnesota	William M. Lewis	Anthony E. Filip	Phi	N/A	N/A		
27th	1968	Tuscaloosa, Alabama	Isaac B. Hanks	Allan T. Mense	Phi	N/A	N/A		
28th	1970	Houston, Texas	Elwin L. Vinal	H. Thomas Collins	Epsilon Beta	N/A	N/A		
29th	1972	Nashville, Tennessee	Charles W. Britzius	Thomas R. Herman	Lambda Beta	N/A	N/A		
30th	1974	Indianapolis, Indiana	Charles E. Wales	Frank T. Philpott, George Puls III	Lambda Beta	Rho	N/A		
31st	1976	Rapid City, South Dakota	Robert E. Pope	A. Thomas Brown	Lambda Beta	Upsilon	N/A	Granted membership eligibility to women	
32nd	1978	Columbus, Ohio	J.W. Howe	John R. McClellan	Lambda Beta	Tau Nu Beta	N/A		
33rd	1980	Tuscaloosa, Alabama	George G. Dodd	Randall L. Patton	Kappa Beta	Mu	N/A		
34th	1981	Madison, Wisconsin	William K. Rey	Dean W. Bettinger					
35th	1982	Houston, Texas	Stephen J. Barth	John C. Roberts	Kappa Beta	Alpha	N/A		
1983 Conference	1983	Fayetteville, Arkansas		Russell G. Pittman, Stephen D. Willner					
36th	1984	Lawrence, Kansas	J. Sidney Marine	Randy L. Saunders	Phi	Tau	N/A		
1985 Conference	1985	Raleigh, North Carolina		David Leong					
37th	1986	St. Louis, Missouri	C. Raymond Hanes	Michael T. Abraham, Pierre J. LaMere	Kappa Beta	Kappa Beta	N/A		
1987 Conference	1987	Detroit, Michigan		Michael J. Palmer					
38th	1988	St. Louis, Missouri	Nick Trbovich	Carl W. Woodward	Kappa Beta	Omicron	N/A		
1989 Conference	1989	Columbus, Ohio		Michael R. Benoit					
1990 Convention	1990	Iowa City, Iowa	A. Thomas Brown	Robert T. Utzinger	Kappa Beta	Omicron	N/A		
1991 Conference	1991	Detroit, Michigan		Carl E. Sickles					
1992 Convention	1992	St. Louis, Missouri	Richard J. Russell	Tracy A. White	Mu	Zeta	N/A		
1993 Conference	1993	West Lafayette, Indiana		John F. Gustafson					
1994 Convention	1994	Minneapolis, Minnesota	Randall J. Scheetz	Nicholas C. Croce	Xi Beta	Phi	N/A		
1995 Conference	1995	St. Louis, Missouri		Derek L. Diget					
1996 Convention	1996	Detroit, Michigan	Robert E. Pope	Kendra L. Wyatt	Omicron	Phi	N/A	First risk management policy created	
1997 Conference	1997	Dallas, Texas		James D. Beckwith, Donald R. Hoffman				Last national conference	
1998 Convention	1998	Iowa City, Iowa	Dean W. Bettinger	Aaron S.H. Kochar	Rho Beta, Zeta Gamma	Phi Beta	N/A		
2000 Convention	2000	Scottsdale, Arizona	Lee C. Haas	Paul Priebe	Chi Beta	Chi Beta	N/A		
2002 Convention	2002	Ft. Lauderdale, Florida		Casey Dunagan	Kappa Beta	Kappa Beta	N/A		
2004 Convention	2004	Minneapolis, Minnesota		Sean Campbell	Kappa Beta	Mu	N/A	100th anniversary celebration; Risk Management Policy created	
2006 Convention	2006	Orlando, Florida		John Barnett, Grady McCollum, Rho	Theta Gamma	Theta Gamma	N/A		
2008 Convention	2008	Washington, D.C.		Anthony Hughes	Chi Beta	Kappa Gamma	N/A	National Alumni Club of Theta Tau established	
2010 Convention	2010	Denver, Colorado	Glen Wilcox	Doug Wagner	Chi	Lambda Gamma	N/A		
2012 Convention	2012	Boston, Massachusetts		Christian Lilly, Rho	Kappa Gamma	Alpha	N/A		
2014 Convention	2014	Fort Worth, Texas	Lee Haas and Bob Pope Memorial	Ryan Crownover	Mu	Lambda Gamma	N/A		
2016 Convention	2016	Cincinnati, Ohio		Rena Wang, Alpha	Zeta Delta	Lambda Beta	N/A		
2018 Convention	2018	San Diego, California	Michael Abraham	Eric Wise, Tau Beta	Kappa Gamma	Epsilon Delta	N/A		
2021 Convention	2021	Tampa, Florida		Alex Rogowski, Epsilon Beta	Zeta Epsilon	Theta Epsilon	N/A	"Colony" term changed to "Candidate Chapter"	
2023 Convention	2023	Lexington, Kentucky		Lydia Hardin, Upsilon Beta	Theta Delta	Beta	Rho Delta		
2025 Convention	2025	Milwaukee, Wisconsin		James Lee, Psi Beta	Chi	Chi Beta	Pi Delta	2025 Ritual released	
2027 Convention	2027	Phoenix, Arizona							

== Notable alumni ==
Name	Chapter	Notability	References
Harry Darby	Kappa	U.S. Senator from Kansas	
John W. F. Dulles	Chi	author and historian	
Paul Endacott	Zeta	collegiate basketball player and member of the Basketball Hall of Fame	
Joe Engle	Zeta	astronaut and Commander of Space Shuttle Discovery	
Robert R. Gilruth	Alpha	first director of NASA's Manned Spacecraft Center, now Lyndon B. Johnson Space Center	
John W. Harrelson	Rho	Chancellor of North Carolina State University	
Samuel L. Higginbottom	Theta	Chairman and President of Rolls-Royce	
David House	Beta (Honorary)	former Intel executive known for starting and managing the 'Intel Inside' marketing campaign	
Roy Horstmann	Phi	professional football player and All-American	
Marty Jackley	Omega	Attorney General of South Dakota	
Aelred Kurtenbach	Omega	co-founder and Chairman of Daktronics Inc.	
Curtis LeMay	Sigma	U.S. Air Force general during World War II	
Charles Luckman	Kappa	President of Lever Brothers, architect, and member of President Truman's Committee on Civil Rights	
Simon Ramo	Lambda	led the development of microwave and ICBM technology	
Roger Revelle	Epsilon	scientist and winner of the National Medal of Science	
Donald G. Saari	Beta	American mathematician	
Arthur Edmund Seaman	Beta (Honorary)	curator of the A. E. Seaman Mineral Museum	
Raymond L. Smith	Beta (Honorary)	President of Michigan Tech from 1965 to 1979	
Charles E. Spahr	Zeta	President of Standard Oil of Ohio	
James Spann	Mu	weatherman in Birmingham, AL for ABC 33/40	
Cliff Stearns	Gamma Beta	U.S. Congressman from Florida	
Maxwell R. Thurman	Rho	Vice Chief of Staff of the United States Army from 1983 to 1987, credited with the Army's "Be all you can be" slogan	
Robert J. Van de Graaff	Mu	inventor of the Van de Graaff Generator	
J. R. Van Pelt	Beta	President of Montana Tech and Michigan Tech, and a founding director/curator of Museum of Science and Industry.	
Blake R. Van Leer	Rho (Honorary)	Dean of Engineering at NCSU and President of the Georgia Institute of Technology	
William E. Wickenden	Delta	President of Case Western Reserve University and the American Society for Engineering Education	

== Local chapter or individual misconduct ==
In December 2013, the Michigan Technological University chapter of Theta Tau was suspended for violations of "alcohol, endangerment, community order, disruptive behavior, and hazing provisions." Multiple times during their suspension, they were found in violation of alcohol provisions and failure to comply with the terms of their suspension, and as a result, were expelled in May 2017.

In April 2018, the Syracuse University chapter of Theta Tau was expelled after video surfaced of members using language that was "extremely racist, anti-Semitic, homophobic, sexist and hostile to people with disabilities."

In April 2024, The Cornell University chapter of Theta Tau was suspended for alleged drug and alcohol violations and hazing. Concerns arose after potential new members reported incidents involving cocaine use at fraternity events. Despite a cease and desist order, the chapter continued its activities until Theta Tau Central Office issued a suspension. Individual sanctions were imposed, and the fraternity's charter was suspended for two years. The chapter is expected to be expelled at the 2025 Theta Tau National Convention.

== See also ==
- Professional fraternities and sororities
- Theta Tau Educational Foundation
- Rube Goldberg Machine Contest
