= Rube Goldberg =

American cartoonist (1883–1970)

- Goldberg in 1930
- Born: Reuben Garrett Lucius Goldberg; July 4, 1883; San Francisco, California, U.S.
- Died: December 7, 1970 (aged 87); New York City, U.S.
- Resting place: Mount Pleasant Cemetery in Hawthorne, New York, U.S.
- Education: University of California, Berkeley, College of Engineering
- Occupations: Engineer, sculptor, news reporter, cartoonist
- Known for: Rube Goldberg machines
- Spouse: Irma Seeman (m. 1916)
- Children: 2, including George W. George
- Website: rubegoldberg.org

Reuben Garrett Lucius Goldberg (July 4, 1883 – December 7, 1970) was an American cartoonist, sculptor, author, engineer, and inventor.

Goldberg is known for his cartoons depicting complicated gadgets performing simple tasks in indirect, convoluted ways. The cartoons led to the expression "Rube Goldberg machines" to describe similar gadgets and processes. Goldberg received many honors in his lifetime, including a Pulitzer Prize for political cartooning in 1948, the National Cartoonists Society's Gold T-Square Award in 1955, and the Banshees' Silver Lady Award in 1959.

He was a founding member and first president of the National Cartoonists Society, which hosts the annual Reuben Award, honoring the top cartoonist of the year and named after Goldberg, who won the award in 1967. He is the inspiration for international competitions known as Rube Goldberg Machine Contests, which challenge participants to create a complicated machine to perform a simple task.

== Early life and education ==
Goldberg was born on July 4, 1883, in San Francisco, California, to Jewish parents Max and Hannah (née Cohn) Goldberg. He was the third of seven children, three of whom died as children. Older brother Garrett, younger brother Walter, and younger sister Lillian also survived. Goldberg began tracing illustrations when he was four years old. He took his only drawing lessons with a local sign painter.

== Personal life ==
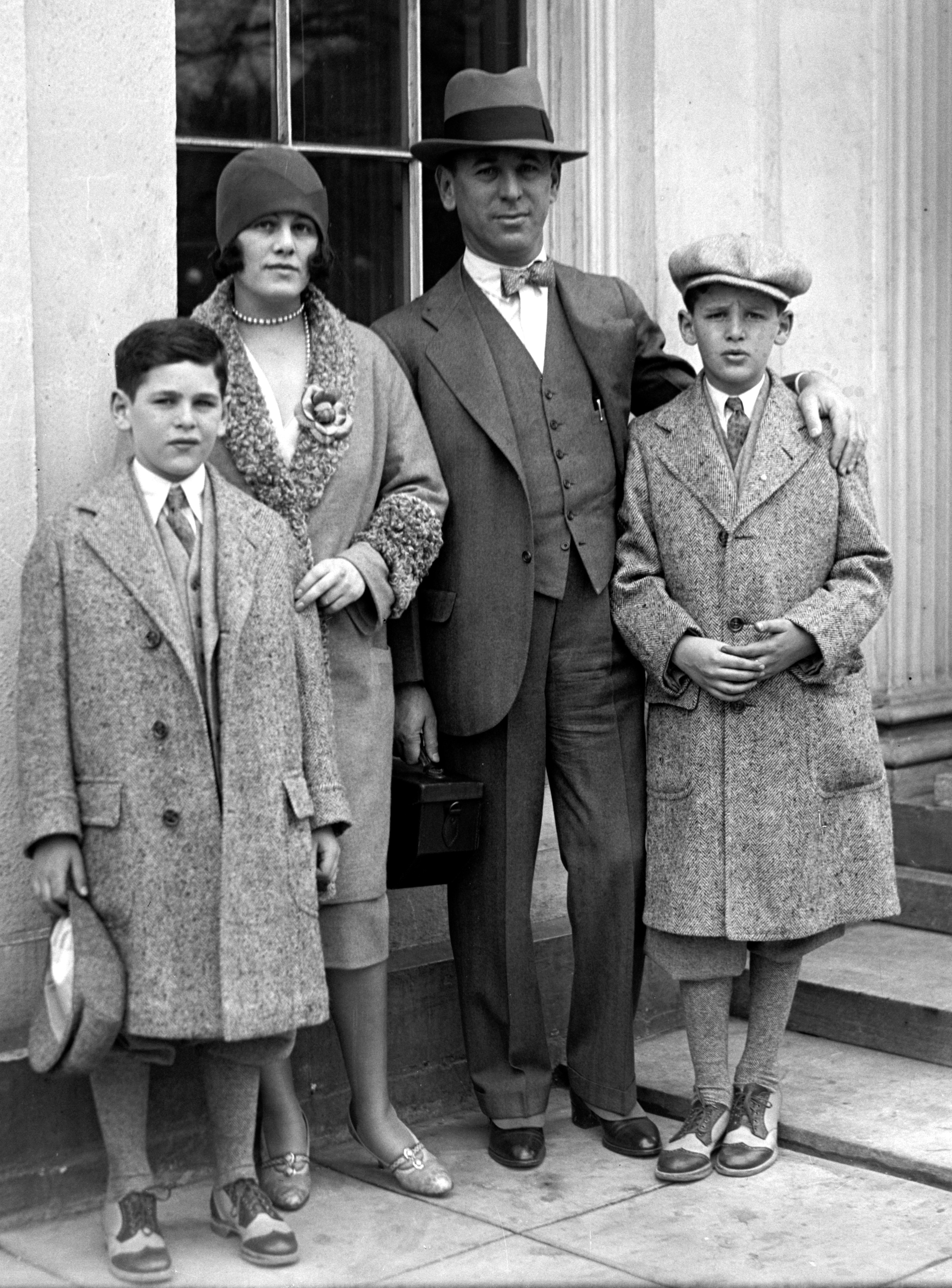
Goldberg with family, 1929

In 1911, he built the R. L. Goldberg Building at 182–198 Gough Street, San Francisco, for his widowed father to live in, as well as to collect rental income.

Goldberg married Irma Seeman on October 17, 1916. They lived at 98 Central Park West in New York City and had two sons: Thomas and George. During World War II, as each of his sons headed off to college, Goldberg insisted that they change their surname because of antisemitic sentiment toward him stemming from the political nature of his cartoons. Thomas chose the surname George, and his brother, whose given name was already George, followed suit. In adopting the same surname, George wanted to keep a sense of family cohesiveness.

== Career ==
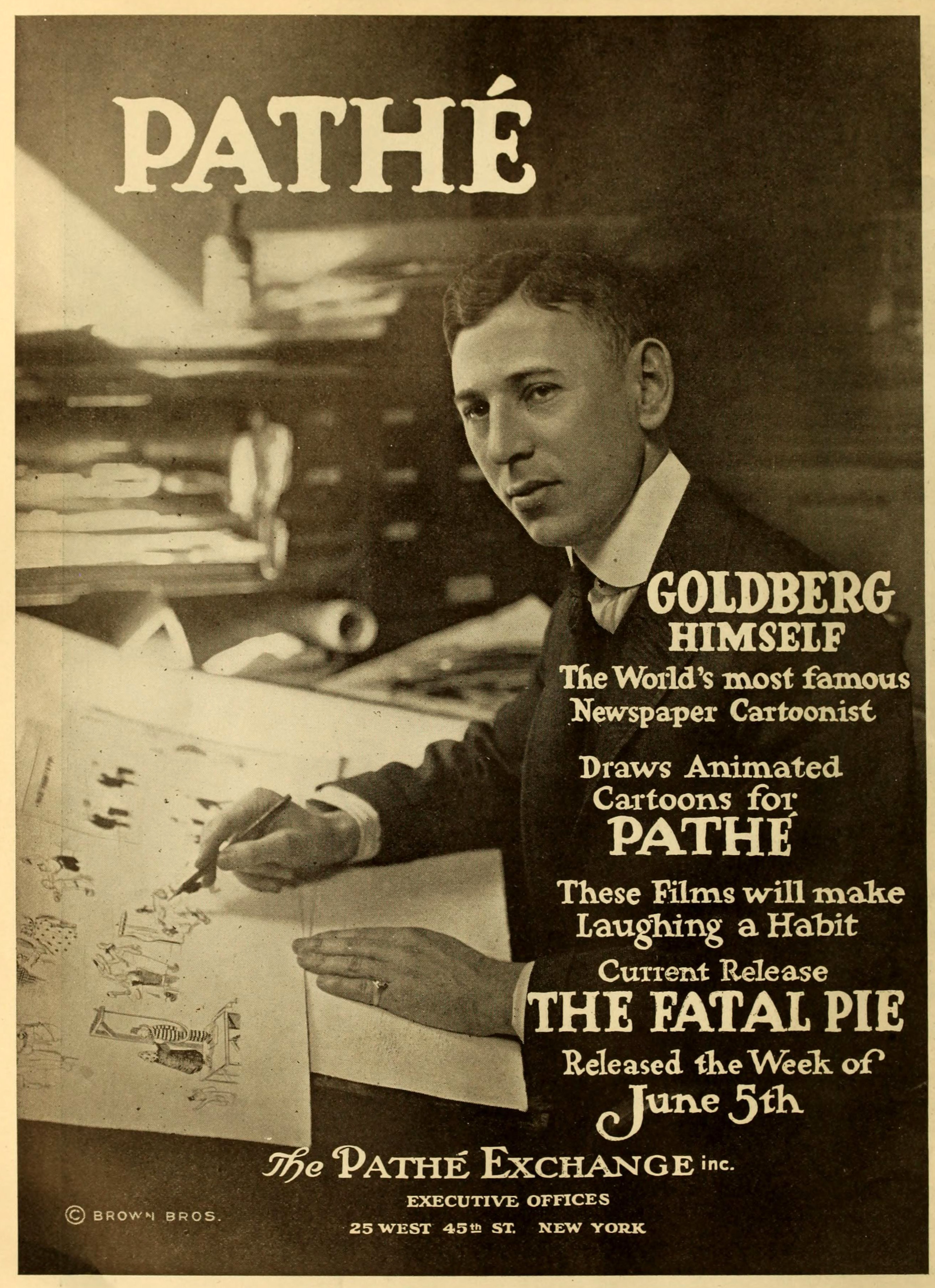
Goldberg in an issue of The Moving Picture World, 1916

Something for Nothing (1940)

Goldberg's father was a San Francisco police and fire commissioner, who encouraged the young Reuben to pursue a career in engineering. Rube graduated from the University of California, Berkeley, in 1904 with a degree in engineering and was hired by the city of San Francisco as an engineer for the Water and Sewers Department. After six months, he resigned his position with the city to join the San Francisco Chronicle where he became a sports cartoonist. The following year, he took a job with the San Francisco Bulletin, where he remained until he moved to New York City in 1907, finding employment as a sports cartoonist with the New York Evening Mail.

Goldberg's first public hit was a comic strip called Foolish Questions, beginning in 1908. The invention cartoons began in 1912. The New York Evening Mail was syndicated to the first newspaper syndicate, the McClure Newspaper Syndicate, giving Goldberg's cartoons a wider distribution, and by 1915 he was earning $25,000 per year and being billed by the paper as America's most popular cartoonist. Arthur Brisbane had offered Goldberg $2,600 per year in 1911 in an unsuccessful attempt to get him to move to William Randolph Hearst's newspaper chain, and in 1915 raised the offer to $50,000 per year. Rather than lose Goldberg to Hearst, the New York Evening Mail matched the salary offer and formed the Evening Mail Syndicate to syndicate Goldberg's cartoons nationally.

In 1916, Goldberg created a series of seven short animated films which focus on humorous aspects of everyday situations in the form of an animated newsreel. The seven films were released on these dates in 1916: May 8, The Boob Weekly; May 22, Leap Year; June 5, The Fatal Pie; Jun 19, From Kitchen Mechanic to Movie Star; July 3, Nutty News; July 17, Home Sweet Home; July 31, Losing Weight.

Goldberg was syndicated by the McNaught Syndicate from 1922 until 1934.

A prolific artist, Goldberg created an estimated 50,000 cartoons during his lifetime. Some of these cartoons include Mike and Ike (They Look Alike), Boob McNutt, Foolish Questions, What Are You Kicking About, Telephonies, Lala Palooza, The Weekly Meeting of the Tuesday Women's Club, and the uncharacteristically serious soap-opera strip, Doc Wright, which ran for 10 months beginning January 29, 1933.

The cartoon series that brought him lasting fame was The Inventions of Professor Lucifer Gorgonzola Butts, A.K., which ran in Collier's Weekly from January 26, 1929, to December 26, 1931. In that series, Goldberg drew labeled schematics in the form of patent applications of the comically intricate "inventions" that would later bear his name. The character of Professor Butts was based on Rube's professor Frederick Slate at the College of Mining and Engineering at the University of California, Berkeley where Rube attended from 1901 to 1903. Frederick Slate gave his engineering students the task of building a scale that could weigh the Earth. The scale was called the “Barodik". To Goldberg, this exemplified a comical combination of seriousness and ridiculousness that would come to serve as an inspiration in his work.

From 1938 to 1941, Goldberg drew two weekly strips for the Register and Tribune Syndicate: Brad and Dad (1939–1941) and Side Show (1938–1941), a continuation of the invention drawings.

Starting in 1938, Goldberg worked as the editorial cartoonist for the New York Sun. He won the 1948 Pulitzer Prize for Editorial Cartooning for a cartoon entitled "Peace Today". He moved to the New York Journal-American in 1949 and worked there until his retirement in 1963. In the 1960s, Goldberg began a sculpture career, primarily creating busts.

== Legacy ==
The popularity of Goldberg's cartoons was such that the term "Goldbergian" was in use in print by 1915, and "Rube Goldberg" by 1928. "Rube Goldberg" appeared in the Random House Dictionary of the English Language in 1966 meaning "having a fantastically complicated improvised appearance", or "deviously complex and impractical." The 1915 usage of "Goldbergian" was in reference to Goldberg's early comic strip Foolish Questions, which he drew from 1909 to 1934, while later use of the terms "Goldbergian", "Rube Goldberg" and "Rube Goldberg machine" refer to the crazy inventions for which he is now best known from his strip The Inventions of Professor Lucifer Gorgonzola Butts, drawn from 1914 to 1964.

The corresponding term in the UK was, and still is, "Heath Robinson", after the English illustrator with an equal devotion to odd machinery, also portraying sequential or chain reaction elements. The Danish equivalent was the painter, author and cartoonist Robert Storm Petersen, better known under his pen name Storm P. To this day, an overly complicated and/or useless object is known as a Storm P.-machine in Denmark.

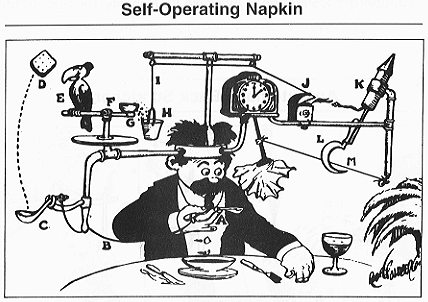
Professor Butts and the Self-Operating Napkin (1931)

Goldberg's work was commemorated posthumously in 1995 with the inclusion of Rube Goldberg's Inventions, depicting his 1931 "Self-Operating Napkin" in the Comic Strip Classics series of U.S. postage stamps.

The Rube Goldberg Machine Contest originated in 1949 as a competition at Purdue University between two fraternities. It ran until 1956, and was revived in 1983 as a university-wide competition. In 1989 it became a national competition, with a high school division added in 1996. Devices must complete a simple task in a minimum of twenty steps and a maximum of seventy-five in Goldberg style. The contest is hosted nationwide by Rube Goldberg Inc., a not-for-profit 501(c)(3), founded by Rube's son George W. George, and currently managed by Rube's granddaughter, Jennifer George.

=== Games ===
Both board games and video games have been inspired by Goldberg's creations, such as the '60s board game Mouse Trap, the 1990s series of The Incredible Machine games, and Crazy Machines. The Humongous Entertainment game Freddi Fish 2: The Case of the Haunted Schoolhouse involves searching for the missing pieces to a Rube Goldberg machine to complete the game.

In 1909 Goldberg invented the "Foolish Questions" game based on his successful cartoon by the same name. The game was published in many versions from 1909 to 1934.

Rube Works: The Official Rube Goldberg Invention Game, the first game authorized by The Heirs of Rube Goldberg, was published by Unity Games (the publishing arm of Unity Technologies) in November 2013.

== See also ==
- Chindōgu
- Deathtrap (plot device)
- Domino effect
- Domino show
- Frederick Rowland Emett
- Jean Tinguely, Swiss artist who created Rube Goldberg-like sculptures
- Mickey One
- PythagoraSwitch
- W. Heath Robinson
