= Nicholas R. Cozzarelli =

American biochemist

Nicholas Cozzarelli
- Born: Nicholas Robert Cozzarelli; March 26, 1938; Jersey City, New Jersey
- Died: March 19, 2006 (aged 67)
- Education: Princeton University; Harvard Medical School
- Known for: Discovery of topoisomerases
- Spouse: Linda Cozzarelli
- Scientific career
- Fields: Biochemistry
- Workplaces: University of Chicago; University of California, Berkeley
- Thesis: The L-L-Glycerophosphate Regulon in Escherichia coli (1966)
- Academic advisors: Arthur Kornberg
- Doctoral students: Patrick O. Brown, Mark Krasnow

Nicholas Robert Cozzarelli (March 26, 1938, in Jersey City, New Jersey – March 19, 2006) was an American biochemist at the University of California, Berkeley, and former editor-in-chief of Proceedings of the National Academy of Sciences.

== Education ==
Cozzarelli attended Princeton University graduated with an A.B. in biology in 1960. He started graduate training at Harvard Medical School advised by E. C. C. Lin and earned a PhD in biochemistry in 1966. Cozzarelli was appointed a postdoctoral researcher with Arthur Kornberg and purified the T4-phage DNA ligase.

== Career and research ==
From 1968 to 1982, Cozzarelli was a professor at the University of Chicago where he studied topoisomerases. In 1982 he joined the faculty at University of California, Berkeley. In 1995, Cozzarelli was named as the editor-in-chief of the Proceedings of the National Academy of Sciences and served in this role from 1995 to 2006. He took the position because he felt that the journal had great unrealized potential. During his tenure, he expanded the editorial board from 26 to more than 140 and created a second track to allow scientists who were not members of the National Academy of Sciences to submit manuscripts directly.

=== DNA ===
Francis Crick wrote in his book What Mad Pursuit:

At about this time, Bill Pohl, a pure mathematician, got into the act. He pointed out, quite correctly, that unless something very special happened, the most likely result of replicating a piece of circular DNA would be two interlocked daughter circles rather than two separate ones. From this he deduced that the DNA chains could not be intertwined, as we had suggested, but had to lie side by side. I corresponded at some length with him as well as talking with him on the phone. Later on he paid me a visit. He had become very well informed about experimental details and persisted strongly in his view. I told him in a letter that if nature did occasionally produce two interlocked circles, a special mechanism would have been evolved to unlink them. I believe he thought this was an outrageous example of special pleading and was not at all convinced by it. It turned out, some years later, that this is exactly what does happen. Nick Cozzarelli and his co-workers showed that a special enzyme, called topoisomerase II, can cut both strands of a piece of DNA, pass another piece of DNA between the two ends, and then join the broken ends together again. It can thus unlink two linked DNA circles, and can even, at high enough concentrations of DNA, produce linked circles of DNA from separate ones.

== Awards and honors ==
Cozzarelli was elected a Member of the National Academy of Sciences in 1989. The Cozzarelli Prize is named in his honor.

== Death ==
Cozzarelli died on March 19, 2006, from the complications of treatment from Burkitt's lymphoma.

Preceded by Lawrence Bogorad	PNAS editor-in-chief 1995-2006	Succeeded by Randy Schekman
