= Mark Krasnow =

Mark A. Krasnow
- Education: University of Illinois, University of Chicago
- Known for: Lung Development
- Scientific career
- Fields: Biochemistry
- Workplaces: Stanford University
- Doctoral advisor: Nicholas R. Cozzarelli
- Other academic advisors: David Hogness

Mark A. Krasnow is a Professor of Biochemistry at Stanford University School of Medicine. He earned his B.S. in Biology and Chemistry from the University of Illinois in 1978, his Ph.D. in biochemistry in 1983, and his M.D. in 1985 from The University of Chicago under the guidance of Nicholas R. Cozzarelli. He did his postdoctoral work on the Ultrabithorax gene with David Hogness at Stanford University. He has been a professor at Stanford since 1988. His research is focused on understanding the molecular, genetic, and cellular mechanisms of tracheal development using drosophila and mice. He has been a Howard Hughes Medical Institute (HHMI) investigator since 1997 and is a Fellow of the American Association for the Advancement of Science and the American Academy of Arts and Sciences. He was elected to the National Academy of Medicine in 2016 and the National Academy of Sciences in 2019.
