= Wallace Trevor Holliday =

American oilman (1884–1950)

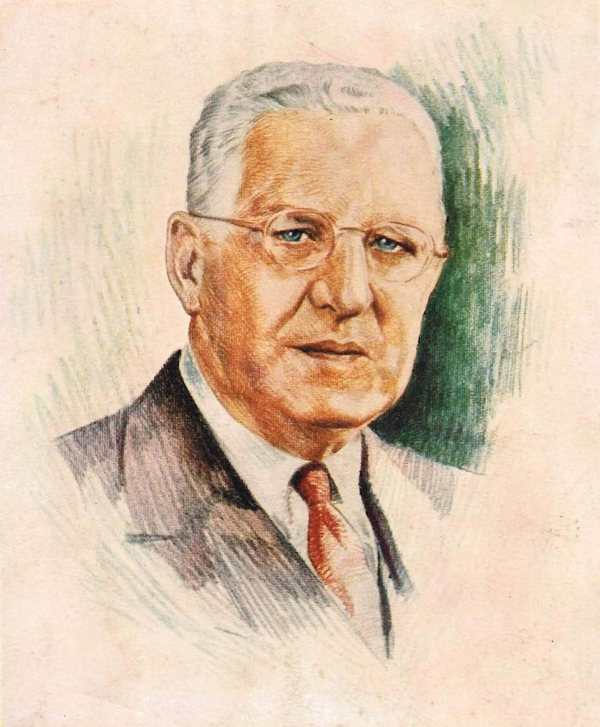
- Born: March 10, 1884; Cleveland, Ohio, U.S.
- Died: November 7, 1950 (aged 66); Cleveland, Ohio, U.S.
- Education: Cornell University (AB 1905); Harvard University (LLB 1908)
- Spouse: Nellie Boyd Stiers (m. 1910)

Wallace Trevor Holliday (March 10, 1884 – November 7, 1950) was president of the Standard Oil Company (Ohio), John D. Rockefeller's' first oil company, from 1928 to 1949 and chairman of the board from 1949 until his death on November 7, 1950.

== Early life ==
Holliday was born in the old Newburgh section of Cleveland, Ohio on March 10, 1884. He was the son of William Wallace Holliday and Mary McDonald Holliday, both of Scottish extraction. His father was a physician in Cleveland for many years. His brother, Clarence was 6 years his junior.

== Education ==
He attended Cleveland South High School, Western Reserve (1901–04) and Cornell (A.B., 1905) Universities, and the Harvard Law School (LL.B., 1908). He held the honorary degree of LL.D. (1947) from Rollins College. The summers of his school years, he worked for the New York Central System Railroad on construction jobs, going up the scale from axman, rodman and topographer to bridge-building inspector.

== Career ==
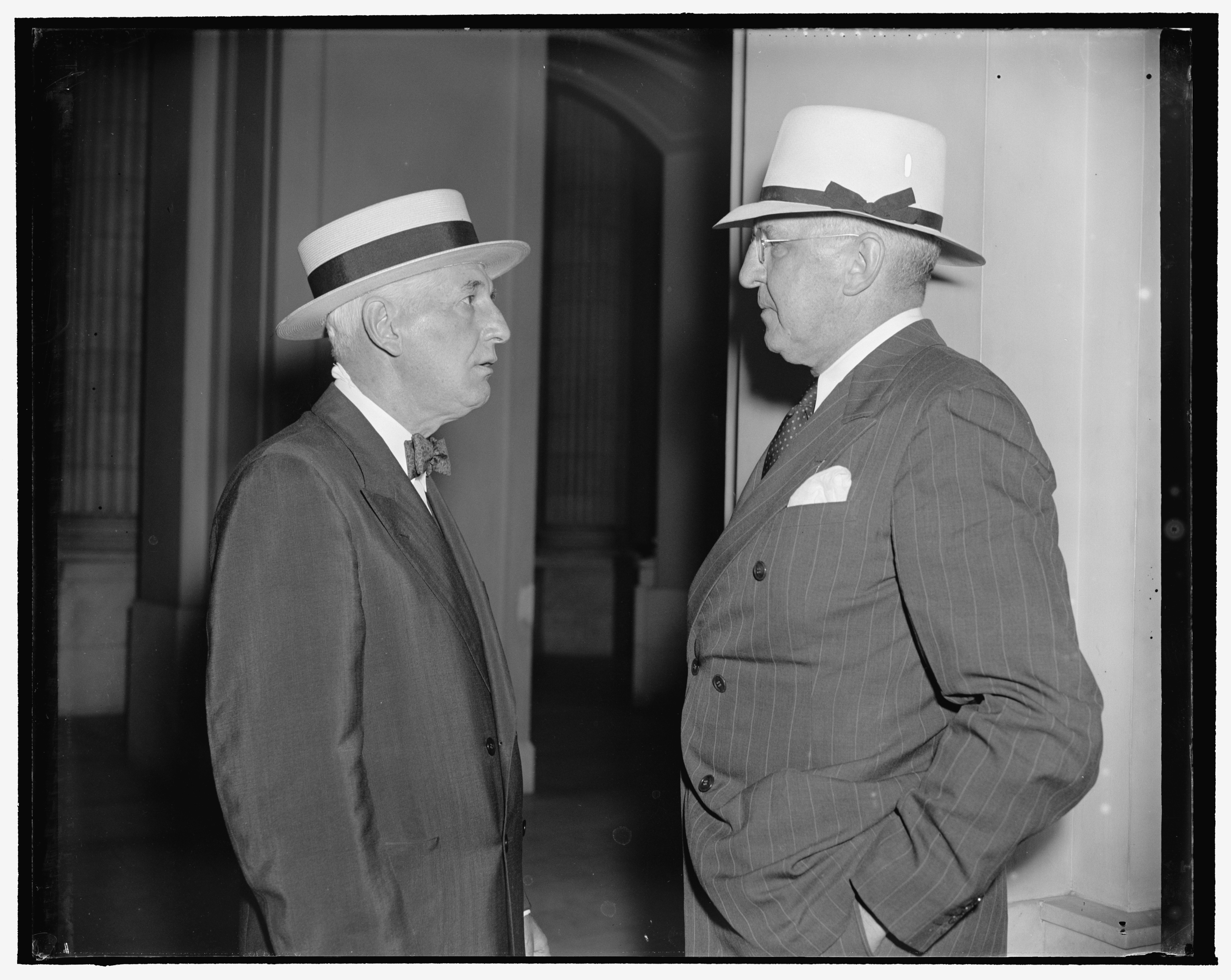
William J. Smith, President, Standard Oil Co. with Holliday in 1939

His first position after leaving Harvard was a nonsalaried spot with the law firm of Kline, Tolles & Goff, attorneys for the Standard Oil interest in the central states. Holliday often took papers to the Forest Hills home of John D. Rockefeller for the billionaire's signature, thus beginning a friendship that continued for 28 years until Rockefeller's death. He became a partner in the law firm Niman, Grossman, Buss & Holliday, which became Holliday, Grossman, & McAfee, the forerunner of McAfee, Grossman, Taplin, Hanning, Newcomer & Hazlett. He was attorney for various oil-producing pipe-line and refining and marketing companies, and in 1917, began serving as general counsel for The Standard Oil Company. He argued a case before the U.S Supreme Court in 1917.

In April, 1928, Holliday became president of Rockefeller's' first oil company. He succeeded Andrew Palmer Coombe, who had retired. Holliday remained in the presidency until April 25, 1949, when he became chairman of the board and was succeeded as president by Clyde T. Foster.

Sohio's sales, declining when he took over the presidency, jumped 150% in his first two years and continued to climb even through the depression. Under his leadership the company pioneered in establishing pre-fabricated enameled steel and glass service stations which replaced their less-appealing predecessors. He also helped in the development of distribution pipe lines for refined gasoline, which reduced retail gasoline costs.

He and an artist friend designed the tricolor service stations. He also painted the trucks flaming red and the salesmen's cars red with blue fenders. Sales soared as he went to work on every phase of the business, establishing training schools for station attendants and following one of his chief ideas that the key to management was the industrial relations department. Under his direction, the company became a second family for its employees. Promotions were made from within the company, causing the famous quotation "when the President retires, we hire a new office boy". Sohio's sales rose from about $44,000,000 in 1928 to more than $256,500,000 in 1949.

== Marriages ==
Nellie B. Stiers was Holliday's first wife and bore him 3 children: Samuel Trevor, James R., and Margaret Louise. They were divorced in 1939. Stiers died in Innsbruck, Austria in 1960 but was interred at the couples' summer home in Chardon, Ohio.

In 1940, Holliday married Mary Annat Osborne, whose first husband, Carl Norton Osborne, had divorced her to marry May Allison, a former silent film star. Children from her first marriage, William A. Osborne and Mary Osborne, came to live with them.

== World War II ==
Holliday served on the Petroleum Industry War Council (PIWC) from 1941 to 1945. Both his sons enlisted and served in the Army throughout the war.

== World peace movement ==
Holliday was one of the seven national vice presidents of the world's leading federalist organization, the United World Federalists, Inc. and an advocate of the world government.

In 1947 he wrote a long article, entitled "Our Number One Job: World Peace," which in January 1948 was privately published in a booklet. In the same month, The Reader's Digest published a condensed version of that article as its lead feature.

== Fraternal organizations ==
He was a member of Delta Upsilon fraternity and belonged to the Rowfant Union, Cleveland Athletic and Chagrin Valley Hunt Clubs.

== Industry leadership ==
He was a director of the American Petroleum Institute, the National Petroleum Association and the National Industrial Conference Board and was a member of the National Petroleum Council.

He served on the Petroleum Code Authority (NRA) from 1933 to 1935 and was a director of the National Association of Manufacturers from 1932 to 1943 and regional vice-president from 1939 to 1942.

== Community affairs ==
Holliday arranged for Alonzo G. Wright to become the first African American to lease a Sohio station, at E. 93rd and Cedar, the first Standard Oil station in a predominantly black neighborhood. Wright later went on to national fame as a real estate developer.

He headed the Great Lakes Exposition in 1937 and in 1938 was president of the Cleveland Convention and Visitors Bureau. In 1943 he became president of the Cleveland Chamber of Commerce, in which he had served for years on such committees as manufacturers, public finance and taxation, and aviation. He led the Chamber's "Cleveland Plan" in 1938 to sell Cleveland business to the nation. In 1947 he was vice-president of the Ohio Chamber of Commerce.

In 1945, he joined other community leaders to incorporate the Air Foundation, a nonprofit organization making grants and scholarships for space and aviation-related purposes.

== Philanthropy ==
In 1945 he was appointed chairman of the $9,525,000 campaign for the Greater Cleveland Hospital Fund, the largest co-ordinated hospital campaign ever undertaken in the United States. He and his wife also made donations to the hospital campaign.

== Death ==
Holliday died 7 November 1950 of a pulmonary abscess.
