= David Hogness =

American biochemist (1925–2019)

David Swenson Hogness
- Born: November 17, 1925; Oakland, California
- Died: December 24, 2019 (aged 94); Stanford, California
- Education: California Institute of Technology
- Known for: TATA box
- Scientific career
- Workplaces: Pasteur Institute; New York University; Washington University in St. Louis; Stanford University; University of Edinburgh
- Academic advisors: Jacques Monod
- Notable students: Richard P. Lifton, Mark Krasnow, Philip Beachy, Jeremy Nathans, John T. Lis

David Swenson Hogness (November 17, 1925 – December 24, 2019) was an American biochemist, geneticist, and developmental biologist.

== Life ==
Hogness spent most of his youth in Chicago, the son of Thorfin R. Hogness and Phoebe S. Hogness. His parents were both children of immigrants and graduates of the University of Minnesota; his father later received a PhD in chemistry from the University of California, Berkeley, taught at Berkeley, and in 1930 joined the faculty at the University of Chicago.

After service in the Navy, David Hogness acquired his bachelor's degree in chemistry in 1949 at the California Institute of Technology; and in 1952, his PhD in biology and chemistry. As a postdoctoral fellow, he worked with a scholarship of the National Research Council with Jacques Monod at the Pasteur Institute, and with a grant from the National Science Foundation at New York University.

In 1955, Hogness became an instructor of microbiology at Washington University School of Medicine and was promoted to assistant professor in 1957. In 1959, he moved to Stanford University School of Medicine. In 1961, he became an associate professor and in 1966, he was promoted to full professor of biochemistry. In 1989, he also became a joint faculty member in Stanford's newly created Department of Developmental Biology. He was professor emeritus since 1999.

Hogness married Judith Gore in 1948; the couple had two sons.

== Research ==
Hogness was essential to understanding the ontogeny of Drosophila melanogaster (fruit fly). He examined the role of the hormone ecdysone in the development of the fruit fly. In 1978, Hogness and his group identified the TATA box (Goldberg-Hogness box) as the start sequence for the transcription of genes in eukaryotes. Hogness' work contributed to the discovery that the genetic material of eukaryotes consists of non-coding (introns) and coding (exons) sections and that the expression of numerous genes is regulated by so-called cis-elements. Hogness contributed to the fusion of genetics, molecular biology, and developmental biology.

== Awards ==
- 1965 Newcomb Cleveland Prize
- 1968 Guggenheim Fellow
- 1976 Member of the National Academy of Sciences
- 1976 Member of the American Academy of Arts and Sciences
- 1977 Howard Taylor Ricketts Award
- 1979 Harvey Lecturer
- 1984 Genetics Society of America Medal
- 1992 Membership of the European Molecular Biology Organization (EMBO)
- 1995 Humboldt Research Award
- 1995 Darwin Prize Visiting Professor, University of Edinburgh
- 1997 March of Dimes Prize in Developmental Biology
- 2002 Lifetime Achievement Award from the Society for Developmental Biology
- 2003 Thomas Hunt Morgan Medal
- 2007 International Prize for Biology
