= Rube Goldberg Machine Contest =

Annual competition among students

2019 Rube Goldberg Machine Contest Winner. The theme was a moon landing, and the task was to put toothpaste on a toothbrush

The Rube Goldberg Machine Contest is a contest in which students of all ages build Rube Goldberg machines to complete an everyday task in the style of American cartoonist Rube Goldberg. The contest is held internationally, as well as virtually after the COVID-19 pandemic. Live regional contests and local and regional winners are eligible and invited to compete in the national contest.

== Judging ==
Teams of students arrive at the competition with a Rube Goldberg machine designed to accomplish the task of the year. Teams of students compete with machines designed to complete the same task under identical parameters. Each machine, depending on age level, must use anywhere from 10-75 steps and complete the task within two minutes. Prior to the 2015 contest, machines used up to 200 steps. Students typically choose a theme, often relating to popular films or historical periods.

Scoring is based on reliability, task completion, most challenging transfers of energy, artistry, creativity, theme, teamwork, and the "Goldberg spirit" of humor. If the machine malfunctions, team members are permitted to manually guide it to the next step; a penalty is assessed for each intervention. Scoring is determined by a series of judges and referees.

== History ==
The Rube Goldberg Machine Contest originated at Purdue University in 1949 as a competition between Theta Tau and Triangle fraternities, and it was held annually until 1956. Phi chapter of Theta Tau revived the contest in 1983 as a competition open to all Purdue students. In 1989, the Theta Tau Rube Machine Contest became a national competition held at Purdue University in March each year with participation by winning entries from local competitions sponsored by Theta Tau chapters across the nation. In addition to the collegiate competition, a high school contest began in 1996. In 2013, the national collegiate contest moved from the Purdue campus to COSI Columbus in Ohio. The national contest has gained much coverage by the press and television media. Past winners of the contest have made appearances on the Late Show with David Letterman and Jimmy Kimmel Live!. The contest is hosted nationwide by Rube Goldberg Inc., a not for profit 501c3 founded by Rube's son, George W. George, to manage the archiving, registrations, and trademarking of Rube Goldberg's work. The Machine Contest is the subject of the feature documentary Mousetrap to Mars. Due to the Covid-19 pandemic, the 2020 contest was held virtually, and the challenge was to drop a bar of soap into a hand. In 2022, the national contest director, Zach Umperovitch used his Rube Goldberg experience to break into the television world as the host for the Discovery series Crazy Contraptions.

== International Influence ==
The Rube Goldberg Machine Contest has inspired many international competitions and spinoffs, particularly in Asia. The World Green Mech contest, based in Taiwan, invites high school winners of regional competitions to build the most creative, complex Rube Goldberg Machines possible. The Japanese educational television program PythagoraSwitch features Rube Goldberg machines during each episode. A "Pythagorean device" is the Japanese colloquial equivalent to a Rube Goldberg machine.

In 2024, teams from 14 different countries and 22 USA states participated in the Live and Online Rube Goldberg Machines competitions.

== Past tasks ==
Past tasks have included:

- 2027 Flip a switch
- 2026 Open a box
- 2025 Feed a pet
- 2024 Put toothpaste on a toothbrush
- 2023 Build a Lunchables
- 2022 Open a book
- 2021 Shake and pour a box of Nerds
- 2020 Drop a bar of soap into someone’s hands
- 2020 Turn off a light
- 2019 Put money in a piggy bank
- 2018 Pour a bowl of cereal
- 2017 Apply an adhesive bandage
- 2016 Open an umbrella
- 2015 Erase a chalkboard
- 2014 Zip a zipper
- 2013 Hammer a nail
- 2012 Inflate a balloon and pop it
- 2011 Watering a plant
- 2010 Dispense an appropriate amount of hand sanitizer into a hand
- 2009 Replace an incandescent light bulb with a more energy efficient light-emitting design
- 2008 Assemble a hamburger
- 2007 Squeeze the juice from an orange
- 2006 Shred five sheets of paper
- 2005 Change batteries and turn on a two-battery flashlight
- 2004 Select, mark and cast an election Ballot
- 2003 Select, crush and recycle and empty soft drink can
- 2002 Select, raise and wave a U.S. flag
- 2001 Select, clean and peel an apple
- 2000 Fill and seal a time capsule with 20th-century inventions
- 1999 Set a golf tee and tee up a golf ball
- 1998 Shut off an alarm clock
- 1997 Insert and then play a CD
- 1996 Put coins in a bank
- 1995 Turn on a radio
- 1994 Make a cup of coffee
- 1993 Screw a light bulb into a socket
- 1992 Unlock a lock
- 1991 Toast a slice of bread
- 1990 Put the lid on a Ball jar
- 1989 Sharpen a pencil
- 1988 Adhere a stamp to a letter
- 1987 Put Toothpaste on a Toothbrush
- 1986
- 1985
- 1984 Pour a cup of Pepsi
- 1983 Pour a cup of water

== 1989 contest ==
The 1989 national contest had the task of sharpening a pencil in more than 25 steps. The first national contest winners were from the School of Technology named Watch-N-Ponder, led by Jeff Cottingham. Their machine had as a theme a Distressed Purdue Student with a Broken Pencil about to take a test. Their machine completed the task in 37 steps which featured a large Panic Button that started the machine, a Purdue Student, Purdue Pete dominos, Purdue Pete crushing the IU symbol, color changing water, a small truck loading dock, a plotter writing out "RUBE GOLDBERG" with a pencil, and finally Purdue Pete chopping down a tree which went into a Saw Mill to make a pencil for the Purdue Student. It was described by the Judges as having music, drama, and timely sound effects that made the audience cheer. The team made a video special for the show Newton's Apple as well as a commercial for the United Way campaign. Kathleen Sullivan and Harry Smith of Good Morning America interviewed Jeff Cottingham on air who promoted Purdue University, Theta Tau fraternity, the Purdue School of Technology, and recognized the hard work by all the team members. The University of Wisconsin and the University of Detroit were the two competitors that finished second and third that year, respectively.

== 1990 contest ==
The task for the 1990 national contest was to screw and seal the lid on a ball canning jar in 20 or more steps. The National Championship team, Team Technology, was from Purdue University and included Matt Garbarino, Todd Henry, Phil Santos, Dave Kovaleski, Jerri Keller and Bryan Sower. The theme for Team Technology's machine was "Having a Ball" and took a total of 42 steps to complete the required tasks.

== 2007 contest ==
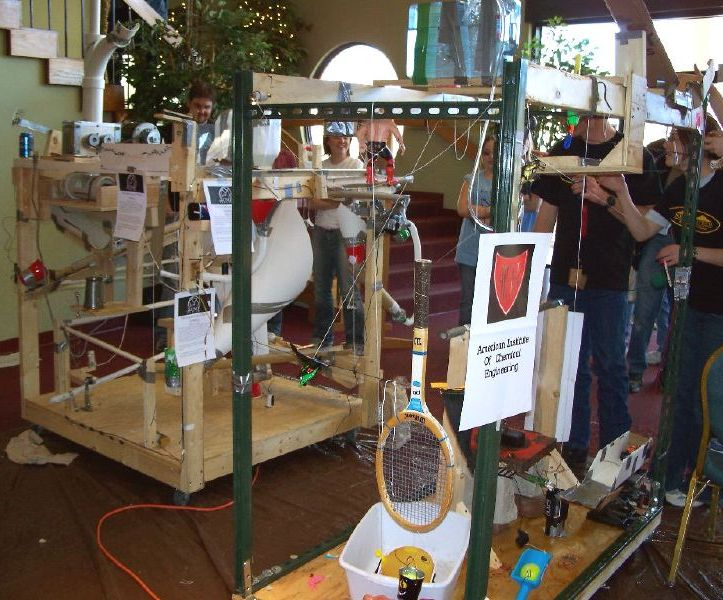
one of the 2007 entries

The 2007 national contest had the task of juicing an orange into a pitcher and pouring the pitcher into a cup in 20 or more steps. It was won by a team from Ferris State University, located in Big Rapids, MI, with a toy factory themed machine. Purdue placed second with a James Bond-themed machine.

== 2008 contest ==
The 2008 national contest had the task of building a hamburger with a meat patty, two vegetables and two condiments in 20 or more steps.

The winner for 2008 was the Purdue Society of Professional Engineers (PSPE) Rube Goldberg Team from Purdue University. This was their third win in the past four years. The team included 17 members from different fields of engineering and aviation and was led by Captain Drew Wischer and by Assistant Captains, Zach Umperovitch and Greg Bauman.

Texas A&M University took 2nd at the competition and University at Buffalo placed 3rd.

Texas A&M was voted as the best overall machine but was not awarded first place because they did not have a complete flawless run.

Other teams that competed included Ferris State University (2007 champions), Big Rapids, Michigan; Michigan Technological University, Houghton, Michigan; Penn State Brandywine, Media, Pennsylvania, and the University of Texas at Austin.

== 2009 contest ==
The task for the 2009 contest was to "Replace an Incandescent Light Bulb with a More Energy Efficient Light Emitting Design" The team fielded by St. Olaf College won this competition.

== 2010 contest ==
The task for the 2010 contest was to "dispense an appropriate amount of hand sanitizer into a hand." The winner was a team from the University of Wisconsin–Stout. Second place went to St. Olaf College and third went to Pennsylvania State University.

== 2011 contest ==
The task for the 2011 contest was to "Water a Plant". The National Contest was held at Purdue University on March 26, 2011 and had 11 teams in attendance. The 11 teams represented 10 states, 9 universities and 2 community colleges.

The winner of the 2011 contest was the University of Wisconsin-Stout giving them back to back championships. Second place went to the American Society of Mechanical Engineers from Penn State University and third place went to the Psi Beta chapter of Theta Tau fraternity from The University of Texas.

Jennifer George, Legacy Director of Rube Goldberg, Inc and granddaughter of Rube Goldberg was also in attendance. Ms George also announced the task for the 2012 contest which will be to "Blow Up and Pop a Balloon" with the National Contest being held again at Purdue University in March 2012

The Purdue Society of Professional Engineers, set a new Guinness World Record for most steps in a Rube Goldberg Machine with 244 steps shattering the previous record of 230.

== 2012 contest ==
The 2012 task was inflating and popping a balloon. St Olaf College defeated seven other universities to take the national title held at the contest held at Purdue University on March 31, 2012. These teams included University of Arizona, Texas A&M, University of Texas, Purdue University and Penn State.

Purdue University placed second while winning the People's Choice Award for a 300-step machine that smashed its own Guinness World Record for the machine with the most steps. The final step, an accordion arm that popped the balloon, was named the most Rube-like step in the competition.

Penn State claimed third place with their food-themed machine.

First year team University of Arizona and their bathroom-themed machine won the legacy award, given to the team whose machine best incorporates humor with critical thinking.

Jennifer George, Legacy Director of Rube Goldberg, Inc and granddaughter of Rube Goldberg, once again announced the task for the 2013 contest which will be to "Hammer a Nail".

The 2012 high school competition, which had the same task, saw 12 teams compete at Ferris State University. First place went to Kimberly High School from Kimberly, Wisconsin. Second place went to Minooka Community High School from Minooka, Illinois. Third went to Anderson High from Anderson, Indiana.

== 2013 contest ==
Hammering a nail was the 2013 task. This was the first year that the contest was held outside of the Purdue campus; the event was held at COSI Columbus in Ohio.

Washington University in St. Louis took the first place prize, as well as the award for Best Single Step with their machine titled Rube's Office. Team members were Grace Kuo, Amy Patterson, Harison Wiesman and Alexa Lichtenstein.

== 2014 contest ==
The task for the 2014 competition was to zip a zipper. The competition was held at COSI in Columbus Ohio, as in 2013.

Purdue University took first place in the competition with a childhood themed machine. Their controversial final step involved zipping the jacket zipper of a human standing in the machine, which arguably broke with the competition rule prohibiting the use of live animals in the machine.

Washington University in St. Louis took second place, as well as the prizes for People's Choice and Best Single Step with their machine themed "Going Green".

== National collegiate contest winners ==
Year	First place	Second place	Third place	People's Choice Award
1983	Slo-Mo-Flo-Pro https://earchives.lib.purdue.edu/digital/collection/debris/id/58981/rec/2	ΘΤ Phi Chapter Purdue		
1984				
1985				
1986				
1987				
1989				
1990				
1991				
1992	Wisconsin–Milwaukee "Indiana Jones"	Purdue	University of Arkansas	
1993	Hofstra "Fester's Finaglers"	Wisconsin–Milwaukee "Rube's Toyland"	Purdue	
1994	Hofstra			
1995	Purdue	Wisconsin–Milwaukee	Hofstra	
1996	Purdue			
1997	Texas	Wisconsin–Madison	Hofstra	
1998				
1999	Purdue SME "Wide World of Sports"	Texas	Oakland	Hofstra
2000	Texas "Rube Goldberg's Entertainment Machine"	Toledo "Touring America"	Purdue SWE "Traveling Through Time"	Toledo
2001	Purdue SME "The Big Apple"	Toledo ASME "The Apple Olympics"	Texas "Goldberg, Rube Goldberg"	Purdue
2002	Texas ΘΤ	Purdue SPE "Mission to Mars"	Toledo Theta Tau	Purdue
2003	Purdue ΘΤ/ΦΣΡ	Toledo ASME	Texas IEEE	Purdue
2004	Purdue SME	Ferris State	Texas IEEE	Purdue
2005	Purdue SPE	Ferris State	Texas	Purdue
2006	Purdue SPE "The Rube Goldberg Machine Ate My Homework"	Toledo SPS "Monster"	Texas	Purdue
2007	Ferris State "Toy Factory"	Purdue SPE "00J: The Orange Juice is Not Enough"	Texas A&M "Mad Science"	
2008	Purdue SPE	Texas A&M	Buffalo	
2009	St. Olaf "Mad Scientists"	Illinois "Scene of the Crime"	Ferris State "House of Rube"	St. Olaf
2010	Wisconsin–Stout "Valley of the Kings"	St. Olaf	Penn State	
2011	Wisconsin–Stout	Penn State	Texas	
2012	St. Olaf	Purdue SPE/SHPE	Penn State	Purdue
2013	Washington University in St. Louis "Rube's Office"	Purdue		
2014	Purdue SPE	Washington University in St. Louis "The Green Machine"		Washington University in St. Louis "The Green Machine"
2015	Purdue SPE	Purdue ASME	Penn State SES	
2016	UW Barron	Purdue SPE	UIUC Urbana	
2017	Purdue ASME	Purdue SPE	Brown University	
2018	Purdue SPE	UIUC Urbana	Purdue ASME	
2024	Purdue	University of Arizona	University of Illinois Urbana	Purdue

National High School Winners

2009 Second Place: Cornerstone Christian Homeschoolers (K-12), Champaign, Il
