= Charles E. Spahr =

American oilman (1913–2009)

- Born: October 8, 1913; Kansas City, Kansas
- Died: April 7, 2009; Shaker Heights, Ohio
- Education: University of Kansas (BCE 1934); Harvard University (MBA 1938)
- Spouse: Mary Jane Bruckmiller (m. 1937)
- Military career
- Branch: United States Army
- Service years: 1942–1945
- Rank: Major
- Unit: Army Corps of Engineers
- Conflicts: World War II

Charles Eugene Spahr (October 8, 1913 – April 7, 2009) was the youngest person to be appointed President of Sohio (Standard Oil of Ohio). He was then appointed as CEO of Sohio from 1959 to 1977, and was instrumental in the building of the Alaskan Pipeline.

== Early life ==
Spahr's grandfather, Moses Spahr, was a Methodist minister, sent to minister in the Coffeyville, Kansas, area, located on the southern Kansas border, prior to Oklahoma becoming a state. Growing up on a small family farm in Independence, Missouri, Spahr’s father worked at the nearby Sugar Creek refinery location of the Standard Oil Company of Indiana.

== Education and early career ==
Spahr's first job was an overturning apples at a cider mill. He finished high school in 1930 and entered the University of Kansas. Graduating with his bachelor's degree in Civil Engineering in 1934, he was a member of the Theta Tau Professional Engineering Fraternity and of the Tau Beta Pi Engineering Honor Society.

Spahr worked his way through college during the Great Depression by binding books for the engineering program, and working as chauffeur for Chancellor Ernest Lindley. He would later give money to the University of Kansas, which helped fund the construction of a large classroom in the new School of Engineering building and the Spahr Engineering Library for the University. Following his graduation from the University of Kansas, he worked as a boiler operator at the Sugar Creek Refinery in Sugar Creek, Missouri.

He then went to work for Phillips Petroleum Company in Bartlesville, Oklahoma, as assistant to the vice-president of Engineering. After three years, he did graduate studies in industrial management at Harvard Business School.

== Marriage ==
When he was on Christmas holiday at home, his sister Marjorie arranged him a date with her school classmate Mary Jane Bruckmiller, who became his wife in 1937. He married Mary Jane Bruckmiller of Sugar Creek just before leaving for Harvard. Her father was a superintendent at the Sugar Creek refinery where Spahr's father was employed as a foreman. The two men knew one another. During their marriage, Charles and Mary Jane had five children: Sally, Steve, Cynthia, Stephanie, and Susan. Stephanie and Susan are twins.

== Standard Oil career path ==
Spahr's first job after graduating from college was as an analytical statistician at the Sugar Creek refinery with a monthly salary of $100. After his time at Harvard Business School, Spahr returned to Bartlesville for roughly six months before going to work for Standard Oil in Cleveland, Ohio, where he remained for the next 38 years. His first position was that of Pipeline Designer. In 1936 he started working in Phillips Petroleum Co., first as a field engineer, then as assistant to the vice president for engineering.

Sparh joined Standard Oil (Ohio) in 1939, building pipelines. There, Spahr became Vice President of Transportation in 1951, in charge of barges, waterways, etc. In 1952, he served in the US government’s Petroleum Administration for Defense as director of the supply and transportation division.

In 1955, he became Sohio's Executive Vice President of all operations other than oil production and exploration. Attaining the position of President in 1957, and in charge of all operations, Spahr was the youngest President in Sohio history. He was then awarded the position of Chief Executive Officer in 1959. In 1974 and 1975 Spahr served in industry trade groups obtaining the position of chairman of the American Petroleum Institute.

Spahr claimed that in his competition for the CEO position, the board was composed of employees of Sohio and members from outside of the company. The board announced their decision to interview an employee from inside the company, and a second member from outside. The board had decided to select the outside member, who was from an industry unrelated to petroleum. When they approached Spahr, he reputedly stated that if not he was not named as CEO, then he would seek employment elsewhere. The board changed its decision.

== The Alaskan pipeline ==
The Atlantic Richfield Company discovered oil in Alaska in 1968. It had the largest oil reserves of about 10 billion barrels of crude. In late 1968 and early 1969, Charlie Spahr began to work out the details of Sohio’s working relationship with BP in Prudhoe Bay. BP had substantial area in Prudhoe Bay, but had no American refineries, which they viewed as the most important oil market in the world. By forging a relationship with Sohio, BP was able to take advantage of the talents of an established company. In 1987, BP became a possessor of the 45 percent of Standard Oil. Thus it swallowed up the original oil business which was built by John D. Rockefeller in Cleveland and it has stayed for a long period of time "one of the largest and most famous companies in the world". Until that point, though Sohio had diversified through coal, and the creation and growth of a series of motels and restaurants on the new Interstate Highway system, it was still just a marketer and refiner. Sohio needed to produce oil, as well as refine and market oil products. It took Spahr about seven years to complete all the necessary works for oil to begin transporting through the pipeline in 1977. It was the year of Sparh retiring from Standard Oil.

The Alaskan pipeline was a development of great magnitude. There were weather handicaps, and large quantities of supplies had to be moved over great distances. The four years spent addressing political matters allowed for in-depth study of the process of building the pipeline. Once started, time was one of the greatest challenges; there was roughly a six-week window in which materials could be moved through the Bering Strait by ship.

In his taped interview, Spahr expresses a positive attitude toward the environmental groups which were critical of the building of the pipeline. “I think that the opposition we encountered, particularly in the beginning, was healthy, because it did make us doubly sure that our designs were good. The Caribou herds grew by four times their 1969 size, as the pipeline grounds produced grazing lands. Their migration was not impeded, as was a concern on the part of environmental groups at that time.”

== Observations ==
Charles Spahr described himself in interviews as preferring a style of productive management over management limited to the financial perspective.

== World War II ==
Spahr served as an Army Corps of Engineers major in charge of pipeline construction during World War II. Assigned to the China-Burma pipeline, he gained significant experience in pipeline installation while making important military connections. During the war he helped "build 1,800 miles of pipeline in Burma and supervised construction of a 570-mile section of the India-Burma-China emergency fuel pipeline to supply gasoline for long-range bombers."

== Philanthropy ==
Through 2011 Spahr and his wife (who died within a year of each other) through their estate had donated $45 million to the University of Kansas with much of it going to the School of Engineering.
