= George W. George =

American producer

- Born: George Warren Goldberg; February 8, 1920; New York City, U.S.
- Died: November 7, 2007 (aged 87); New York City, U.S.
- Education: Williams College
- Occupations: Actor, film producer, screenwriter
- Children: 1
- Father: Rube Goldberg

George Warren George (né Goldberg; February 8, 1920 – November 7, 2007) was an American theater, Broadway and film producer. His credits included the film My Dinner with Andre (1981) and several hit Broadway productions.

== Early life ==
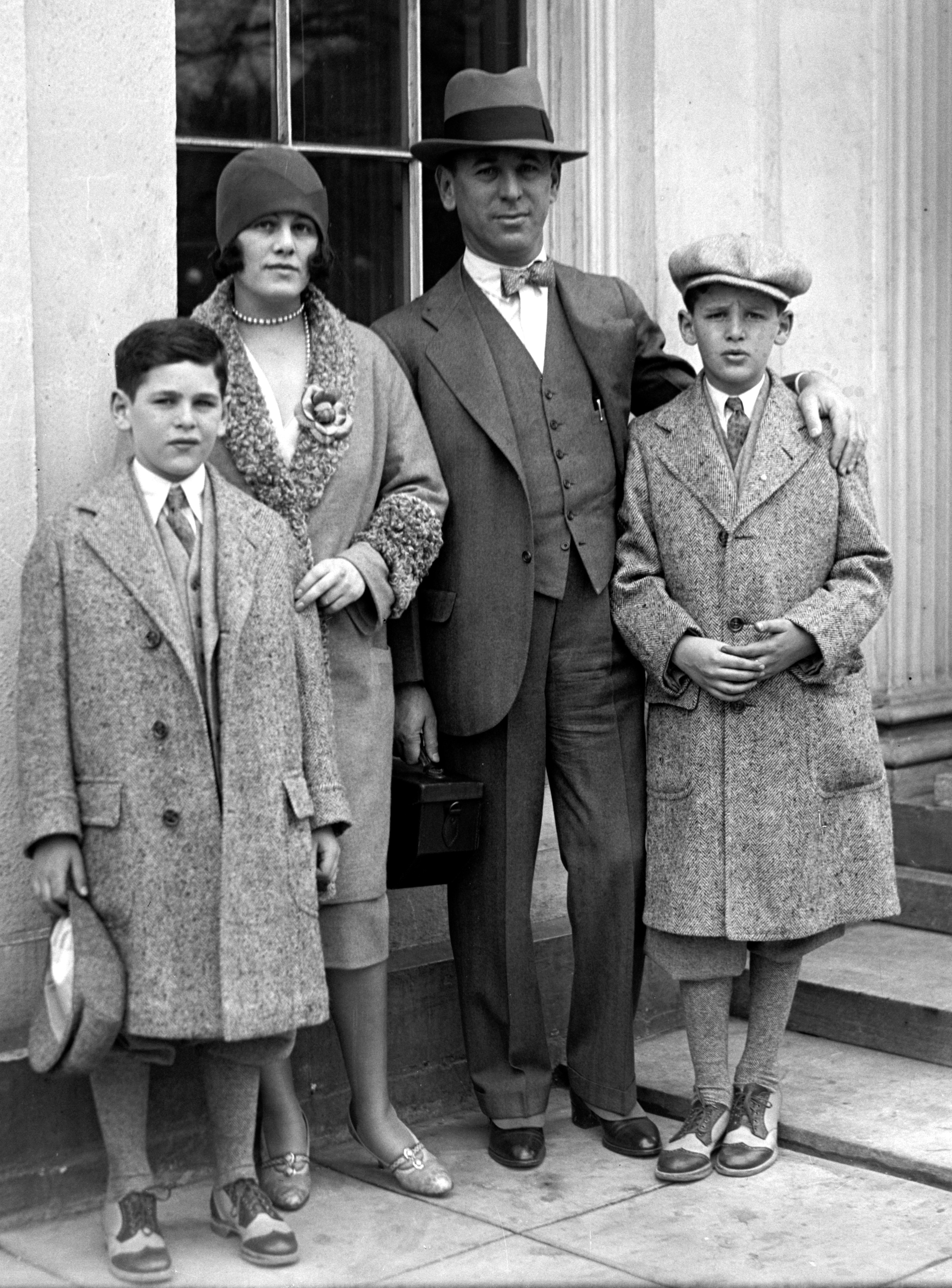
The Goldberg family in 1929

George Warren Goldberg was born in Manhattan on February 8, 1920. His parents were the cartoonist Rube Goldberg and Irma Seeman. George attended Williams College.

George's father often received antisemitic hate mail for his political cartoons during World War II. Rube insisted that before his sons George and Thomas left for college, they change their surnames to protect themselves from the antisemitism. When Thomas chose the last name "George", George decided to take the same surname as his brother. The newly renamed George W. George wanted to keep a sense of family togetherness by having the same name as his brother.

== Career ==
George W. George began his career in television, working as a TV and film screenwriter in the 1950s and early 1960s. His television credits included The Nevadan, Peter Gunn, Gunsmoke, Smoke Signal, and The Rifleman. He and his wife Judith also wrote storylines and screenplays for the ABC television series Combat!, including the episode "The Chateau".

George made his film-producing debut with the 1957 documentary The James Dean Story, which was directed and produced by Robert Altman. Other films to his credit included Rich Kids in 1979, which was written by his wife, Judith Ross George, and Night Watch (1973), which starred Elizabeth Taylor.

George's best-known film was My Dinner With Andre, which was released in 1981. George co-produced the film with Beverly Karp. Starring Andre Gregory and Wallace Shawn, it opened to little enthusiasm but soon received critical acclaim and ultimately pulled in a 5-million-dollar box office gross. At the time, five million was considered a good total for a low-budget, independent film.

George made his Broadway debut in 1964 when he produced Dylan, starring Alec Guinness as Dylan Thomas and written by Sidney Michaels. George soon enjoyed a second consecutive hit with Any Wednesday, which opened shortly after Dylan. Any Wednesday, a comedy which starred Sandy Dennis and Gene Hackman, ran for more than two years on Broadway and led to the film version. Other hits that George W. George produced include Alan Ayckbourn's Bedroom Farce, which earned a Tony Awards nomination for best play in 1979, and Ben Franklin in Paris (1964), which starred Robert Preston.

Despite a string of hits, George was not always successful. His Broadway flops included Happily Never After, which ran for only four shows, The Great Indoors, and Via Galactica, which closed after just seven Broadway performances. His final Broadway credit was for the conception of the musical Memphis, which opened on Broadway in 2009, a few years after George's passing.

George had a daughter Jennifer, born in 1959, who was formerly married to singer/songwriter Marc Cohn. Jennifer George serves as current Legacy Director for the not-for-profit 501(c)(3) Rube Goldberg, Inc. The organization hosts the Rube Goldberg Machine Contest, which began in 1949 at Purdue University, and is based on Goldberg's "invention" cartoons.

== Death ==
George W. George died of Parkinson's disease in Manhattan on November 7, 2007. He was 87 years old.
