= Thorfin R. Hogness =

Chemist and educator (1894–1976)

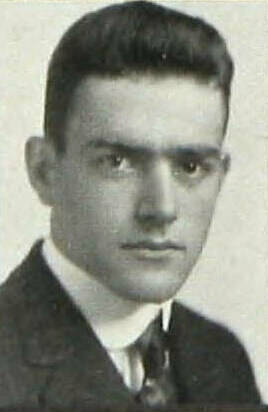
- Born: December 9, 1894; Minnesota
- Died: February 14, 1976 (aged 81); San Jose
- Alma mater: University of Minnesota; University of California, Berkeley
- Occupation: Chemist, educator
- Employer: University of Chicago
- Children: David Hogness, John R. Hogness

Thorfin Rusten Hogness (December 9, 1894, Minneapolis – February 14, 1976, San Jose, California) was a physical chemist, director of plutonium research for the Manhattan Project, and, after WW II, an advocate of "international control of nuclear energy".

== Biography ==
Hogness graduated from the University of Minnesota with a B.S. in 1918 in chemistry and a Ch.E. degree in 1919 in chemical engineering. He received in 1921 a Ph.D. in physical chemistry from the University of California, Berkeley (UC Berkeley). His Ph.D. thesis is entitled The surface tensions and densities of liquid mercury, cadmium, zinc, lead, tin and bismuth. From 1921 to 1930 he was a faculty member at UC Berkeley, except for a leave of absence from 1926 to 1927 when he had a research fellowship at the University of Göttingen. In the chemistry department of the University of Chicago he became in 1930 an associate professor and in 1938 a full professor.

At the University of Chicago after WW II, he continued his professorship, worked on defense research (including the development of ICBMs), and served as director of applied sciences until 1962, when he retired as professor emeritus. He directed from 1948 to 1951 the University of Chicago's Institute of Radiobiology and Biophysics and in 1951 established the University of Chicago's Chicago Midway Laboratories (CML), where his involvement continued until 1961.

In 1946 he was one of eight members of the board of trustees of the Emergency Committee of Atomic Scientists, chaired by Albert Einstein. In 1948 Hogness was one of a group of eight American nuclear energy experts who publicly protested the tactics of the House Committee on Un-American Activities. In 1949 following the September detection of the first Soviet atomic bomb test, he joined Harold C. Urey and other scientists in "stressing that atomic disarmament held the only hope for an international agreement."

Hogness did research on "ionization of gases by electron impact; photochemistry; chemistry kinetics; spectroscopy and physical chemistry applied to biological systems and respiratory enzymes."

He was elected in 1928 a fellow of the American Physical Society and in 1941 a fellow of the American Association for the Advancement of Science.

His wife was Phoebe Swenson Hogness (1895–1972). They married in 1920 and had two sons: John R. Hogness (1922–2007), president (1974–1979) of the University of Washington in Seattle, and David S. Hogness (1925–2019), professor of biochemistry at Stanford University.

== Selected publications ==
=== Articles ===
- Hogness, Thorfin R. (1921). "The Surface Tensions and Densities of Liquid Mercury, Cadmium, Zinc, Lead, Tin and Bismuth". Journal of the American Chemical Society. 43 (7): 1621–1628. doi:10.1021/ja01440a026. hdl:2027/uc1.b3744448.
- ——; Lunn, E. G. (1925). "The Ionization of Hydrogen by Electron Impact as Interpreted by Positive Ray Analysis". Physical Review. 26 (1): 44–55. Bibcode:1925PhRv...26...44H. doi:10.1103/PhysRev.26.44.
- ——; Lunn, E. G. (1924). "The Ionization Potentials of Hydrogen as Interpreted by Positive Ray Analysis". Proceedings of the National Academy of Sciences. 10 (9): 398–405. Bibcode:1924PNAS...10..398H. doi:10.1073/pnas.10.9.398. PMC 1085733. PMID 16576846.
- ——; Harkness, R. W. (1928). "The Ionization Processes of Iodine Interpreted by the Mass-Spectrograph". Physical Review. 32 (5): 784–790. Bibcode:1928PhRv...32..784H. doi:10.1103/PhysRev.32.784.
- ——; Harkness, R. W. (1928). "The Ionization of Carbon Monoxide by Controlled Electron Impact, Interpreted by the Mass Spectrograph". Physical Review. 32 (6): 936–941. Bibcode:1928PhRv...32..936H. doi:10.1103/PhysRev.32.936.
- ——; Kvalnes, H. M. (1928). "The Ionization Processes in Methane Interpreted by the Mass Spectrograph". Physical Review. 32 (6): 942–945. Bibcode:1928PhRv...32..942H. doi:10.1103/PhysRev.32.942.
- ——; Comroe, R. Ruth (1932). "A Search for Evidence of the Radioactive Decomposition of Barium". Proceedings of the National Academy of Sciences. 18 (8): 528–531. Bibcode:1932PNAS...18..528H. doi:10.1073/pnas.18.8.528. PMC 1076273. PMID 16577465.
- T'sai, Sin Sheng; —— (1932). "The Diffusion of Gases through Fused Quartz". The Journal of Physical Chemistry. 36 (10): 2595–2600. doi:10.1021/j150340a007.
- ——; Hogness, T. R. (1934). "The Preparation of Hydrogen Compounds of Silicon". Journal of the American Chemical Society. 56 (5): 1252. doi:10.1021/ja01320a509.
- ——; Wilson, Thomas L.; Johnson, Warren C. (1936). "The Thermal Decomposition of Silane". Journal of the American Chemical Society. 58: 108–112. doi:10.1021/ja01292a036.
- ——; Zscheile, F. P.; Sidwell, A. E. (1937). "Photoelectric Spectrophotometry. An Apparatus for the Ultra-violet and Visible Spectral Regions: Its Construction, Calibration, and Application to Chemical Problems". The Journal of Physical Chemistry. 41 (3): 379–415. doi:10.1021/j150381a005.
- ——; Potter, V. R. (1941). "Spectrometric Studies in Relation to Biology". Annual Review of Biochemistry. 10: 509–530. doi:10.1146/annurev.bi.10.070141.002453.

=== Books ===
- Hogness, T. R. (1937). Qualitative analysis and chemical equilibrium. New York: H. Holt. (5th edition, 1966)
- ——; Johnson, Warren C. (1938). Elementary principles of qualitative analysis. New York: H. Holt.
- ——; Johnson, Warren C. (1941). Ionic equilibrium as applied to qualitative analysis. New York: H. Holt. (3rd edition, 1954)
- ——; Johnson, Warren C. (1957). An introduction to qualitative analysis. New York: H. Holt.
