= Emergency Committee of Atomic Scientists =

Einstein's committee of atomic scientists

- Abbreviation: ECAS
- Formation: May 1946; 80 years ago
- Founders: Albert Einstein; Leó Szilárd
- Dissolved: October 10, 1951; 75 years ago
- Type: Nonprofit, NGO
- Purpose: world peace, atomic education, peaceful use of nuclear energy, international control of nuclear bombs
- Headquarters: Princeton
- Locations: New York; Chicago
- Chairman: Albert Einstein
- Vice-Chairman: Harold C. Urey
- Key people: Linus Pauling; R.F. Bacher; Hans A. Bethe; Edward U. Condon; Thorfin R. Hogness; Harold C. Urey; V.F. Weisskopf
- Funding: private contributions

The Emergency Committee of Atomic Scientists (ECAS) was founded by Albert Einstein and Leó Szilárd in May, 1946, primarily as a fundraising and policy-making agency. Its aims were to warn the public of the dangers associated with the development of nuclear weapons, promote the peaceful use of nuclear energy, and ultimately work towards world peace, which was seen as the only way that nuclear weapons would not be used again.

== History ==
The Committee was established in the wake of the "Szilárd petition" (July 1945) to United States president Harry S. Truman opposing the use of the atomic bomb on moral grounds, which was signed by 70 scientists who had worked on the Manhattan Project. A majority of scientists working on the Manhattan Project did not know entirely what they were creating at the time.

Einstein called on seven other atomic scientists to join the effort, including Linus Pauling, R.F. Bacher, Hans A. Bethe, Edward U. Condon, Thorfin R. Hogness, Harold C. Urey, and V.F. Weisskopf. They were later joined by Selig Hecht, Harrison Brown, and H.J. Mueller.

=== Board of Trustees ===
The Committee only ever consisted of the eight members of the Board of Trustees, who were:

- Albert Einstein Chairman
- Harold C. Urey Vice-Chairman
- Hans Bethe
- Thorfin R. Hogness
- Philip M. Morse
- Linus Pauling
- Leó Szilárd
- Victor Weisskopf

Half the members had worked directly on the Manhattan Project and all had been indirectly involved or consulted on the production of the first atomic bomb.

=== Set of principles ===
"These facts are accepted by all scientists:

1. Atomic bombs can now be made cheaply and in large number. They will become more destructive.
2. There is no military defense against atomic bombs and none is to be expected.
3. Other nations can rediscover our secret processes by themselves.
4. Preparedness against atomic war is futile, and if attempted, will ruin the structure of our social order.
5. If war breaks out, atomic bombs will be used and they will surely destroy our civilization.
6. There is no solution to this problem except international control of atomic energy, and ultimately, the elimination of war.

The program of the committee is to see that these truths become known to public."

=== Objective ===
The Committee's immediate objective was to raise a substantial fund ($1 million) to support educational activities by the atomic scientists, aimed at civilian national and international control of future nuclear energy activities.

== Activities ==
The Committee arranged private contributions to support atomic information and education. To facilitate this, ECAS was incorporated in New Jersey on August 6, 1946. ECAS directed the received contributions towards other groups such as National Committee for Atomic Information (NCAI), Association of Scientists for Atomic Education (ASAE), the Federation of American Scientists (FAS) and the Atomic Scientists of Chicago (ASC) of Bulletin of the Atomic Scientists (BAS). These groups aimed to educate both the general public and the U.S. government about the potential positive and negative aspects of atomic energy. They also conducted extensive educational initiatives.

Several members of the committee gave lecture tours to promote the committee's message of peace. They produced supporting promotional materials, including one of the first films to illustrate what a full nuclear war might be like. Einstein and ECAS was also very vocal in its opposition of the development of the first hydrogen bomb.

=== Baruch Plan ===
Apart from fundraising, these programs aimed to garner backing for initiatives such as the Baruch Plan, which was presented to the United Nations in 1946 and proposed international control of the atomic bombs. The plan was passed by the United Nations Atomic Energy Commission (UNAEC), but not agreed to by the Soviet Union.

=== World Government ===
While committee initially saw success in fundraising efforts, Einstein and his colleagues grew increasingly convinced that the world was veering off course. They arrived at the conclusion that the gravity of the situation demanded more profound actions and the establishment of a "world government" was the only logical solution. In his "Open Letter to the General Assembly of the United Nations" of October 1947, Einstein emphasized the urgent need for international cooperation and the establishment of a world government. In the year 1948, Einstein invited United World Federalists, Inc.(UWF) president Cord Meyer to a meeting of ECAS and joined UWF as a member of the Advisory Board. Einstein and ECAS assisted UEF in fundraising and provided supporting material. Einstein described United World Federalists as: "the group nearest to our aspirations". Einstein and other prominent figures sponsored the Peoples' World Convention (PWC), which took place in 1950-51. Their collaboration paid-off when Thane Read from UWF initiated a worldwide call for the World Constitutional Convention. Members of the ECAS signed the call which lead to the creation of a world constitution, for a democratic federal world government in world constituent assemblies of 1968, 1977, 1978–79, and 1991. These efforts were successful in creating the Constitution for the Federation of Earth and a Provisional World Government consisting of a Provisional World Parliament.

== Committee dissolution and legacy ==
At the end of 1948, with the gradual deterioration of international relations, failure of the United Nations Atomic Energy Commission (UNAEC) in 1947 and escalating international tensions after 1947, committee recognized that:

"education of mankind toward a clear understanding of the implications of atomic energy, and full appreciation of the dangers and hopes inherent in new discoveries, is a long-range task which cannot be solved on an emergency basis."

On the question of disposition of the funds, Einstein wrote Harrison Brown on June 12, 1951:

"When our committee was formed it was undoubtedly our purpose to use our influence to help achieve lasting security in the international field. It is true that the Bulletin of the Atomic Scientists tried in the beginning to serve the same purpose, but today it has become no more than a publication of neutral information. Secondly, there are other organizations working for some kind of world government; in this country, the United World Federalists are the group nearest to our aspirations. But I would prefer, according to Szilard's suggestion, to give the money to the Friends, for they have shown by their steadfast efforts through many years a truly supranational attitude, which was manifest long before the present difficult situation arose."

The proposal put forth by Einstein and Szilard did not ultimately gain acceptance. Instead, the committee's assets were transferred to the Bulletin of the Atomic Scientists. Final dissolution of ECAS was done on September 8, 1951 in a meeting at Einstein's Home and officially dissolved on October 10, 1951.

ECAS was active for four years, until 1950 when it was gradually disbanded, although most of the members continued to campaign against nuclear war, and participated in the development of the Constitution for the Federation of Earth and the Pugwash Conferences on Science and World Affairs.

== See also ==
- Manhattan Project
- Atomic bombings of Hiroshima and Nagasaki
- Szilárd petition
- One World or None (1946)
- Bulletin of the Atomic Scientists
- World government
- World Constitutional Convention call
- World Constitutional Convention
- Constitution for the Federation of Earth
- Russell–Einstein Manifesto
- Pugwash Conferences on Science and World Affairs
