= Citizens for Global Solutions =

Organization in the United States

- Abbreviation: CGS
- Established: February 23, 1947; 79 years ago
- Founded at: Asheville, North Carolina
- Merger of: Americans United for World Government (AUWG); World Federalists, USA; Student Federalists; Georgia World Citizens Committee (GWCC); Massachusetts Committee for World Federation (MCWF)
- Type: Nonprofit
- Headquarters: Washington, D.C.
- Location: Washington, D.C., United States
- Key people: Cord Meyer; Grenville Clark; Thomas K. Finletter; Wallace Trevor Holliday; Albert Einstein; Thane Read
- Formerly called: United World Federalists, Inc. (UWF); World Federalists USA; World Federalists Association (WFA); Campaign for UN Reform (CUNR)

Citizens for Global Solutions is a grassroots-level membership organization in the United States working towards the establishment of a world government in order to avoid future atomic wars.

It has promoted a world federal government, United Nations reform, legislative resolutions, and amendments to the U.S. Constitution to favor a world federal government.

== History ==
The organization's lineage can be traced back to its precursor, the World Federalists, established in 1941. This group subsequently merged with other organizations in 1943 to create the Federal World Government, Inc. which evolved into the World Federalists, USA in 1945, and in 1947, it transformed into the United World Federalists (UWF).

On February 23, 1947, five world federalist organizations – Americans United for World Government (AUWG), World Federalists, USA (World Federalists of America), Student Federalists, Georgia World Citizens Committee (GWCC), and the Massachusetts Committee for World Federation (MCWF) – merged to form the United World Federalists, Inc. (UWF). By 1948, the organization had more than 34,000 members, including 7,000 students. This number grew to more than 50,000 members in the early 1950s.

Cord Meyer IV was the first president of the organization, with Grenville Clark, Thomas K. Finletter, Wallace Trevor Holliday serving as vice-presidents.

=== Albert Einstein ===
In 1948, Cord Meyer was invited to attend a meeting of the Emergency Committee of Atomic Scientists (ECAS) where he met Albert Einstein, Leo Szilard and many of the other leading nuclear physicists. It was then Albert Einstein joined UWF as a member of the Advisory Board and showed his support. Einstein and ECAS assisted UEF in fundraising on numerous occasions and also provided supporting material.

In June, 1951, in his letter to Harrison Brown, Einstein described the United World Federalists as: "the group nearest to our aspirations".

The photo of Cord Meyer meeting with Albert Einstein in 1948 has been widely circulated on the internet and social media, with the false claims of Einstein being with his therapist.

=== Thane Read ===
In 1949, Cord Meyer resigned and was succeeded by Alan Cranston. That same year, Thane Read joined the UWF and would later initiate a worldwide call in 1958 and garner support for the World Constitutional Convention ultimately leading to the development of the Constitution for the Federation of Earth.

Later UWF was renamed as World Federalists USA.

=== Split and remerge ===
In 1975, the organization turned its focus to educational activities as the World Federalist Association (WFA), while members who wanted to continue political action efforts formed the Campaign for UN Reform (CUNR). The two groups merged as Citizens for Global Solutions (CGS) in 2003.

== List of Past Presidents ==
- Cord Meyer (1947-1949)
- Alan Cranston (1949-1952)
- Norman Cousins (1952-1954)
- C. Maxwell Stanley (1954-1956)
- Donald Harrington (1956-1959)
- Charles C. Price III (1959-1961)
- Paul W. Walter (1961-1964)
- C. Maxwell Stanley (1964-1966)
- Arnold S. Zander (1966-1967)
- Neal Potter (1967-1968)
- James G. Patton (1968-1969)
- Joseph S. Clark (1969-1971)
- Luther H. Evans (1971-1976)
- Norman Cousins (1976-1990)
- Charles C. Price III (1990-1992)
- John B. Anderson (1992-2003)

== Recent years ==
In 2006, CGS launched a campaign to prevent the confirmation of John Bolton as U.S. ambassador to the UN. Bolton, who had been serving in the role as a recess appointment, withdrew from consideration that December.

== See also ==
- Emergency Committee of Atomic Scientists (ECAS)
- Political views of Albert Einstein
- Thane Read
- World government
- World Constitutional Convention call
- World Constitutional Convention
- Constitution for the Federation of Earth
