= Student Federalists =

Organization

- Successor: United World Federalists
- Formation: 1942; 83 years ago
- Founder: Harris Wofford
- Dissolved: 1947; 78 years ago
- Purpose: world peace, democratic federal world government

The Student Federalists was an organization that existed in the United States in the 1940s and 1950s to promote U.S. support for federal world government amongst students and youth. It was founded by Harris Wofford, a student at the University of Chicago, later to become a U.S. Senator from Pennsylvania (1991–95) and president of Bryn Mawr College.

One of the members, Steve Benedict, later served as an assistant to Gabriel Hauge, who was Assistant to the President for Economic Affairs in the administration of Dwight Eisenhower.

It later merged with other organizations to form the United World Federalists at a 1947 conference in Asheville, North Carolina, and became that organization's youth division. Organizational archives can be found among the New York Public Library Archives and Manuscripts collection.
