= Standard Oil Company (Ohio) =

American petroleum company (1870–1987)

The Standard Oil Company (Ohio)
- Type: Public
- Traded as: NYSE: SOH (1911–1986); NYSE: SRD (1986–1987)
- Industry: Petroleum
- Founded: January 10, 1870
- Founder: John D. Rockefeller
- Defunct: 1987; 39 years ago
- Fate: Acquired by BP
- Successor: BP America Inc.
- Headquarters: Standard Oil Building, Cleveland, Ohio
- Products: Gasoline, motor oils
- Brands: Boron (1954–1991); Sohio (1928–1991)

The Standard Oil Company (Ohio) was an American petroleum company that existed from 1870 to 1987. The company, known commonly as Sohio, was founded by John D. Rockefeller. It was established as one of the separate entities created after the 1911 breakup.

In the 1960s, the Standard Oil Company partnered with BP, in the development of the Prudhoe Bay, Alaska petroleum reserves and the construction of the Trans Alaska pipeline. The complex partnership called for a gradual stock acquisition until BP would eventually gain controlling interest culminating in total acquisition of the American company. The company ceased operations in 1987, although BP continued to sell gasoline under the 'Sohio' brand until 1991.

== History ==
Under the name "The Standard Oil Company (Ohio)", the company was established as a separate business after the antitrust breakup the oil conglomerate's monopoly in 1911. It operated service stations under the 'Sohio' brand name in Ohio but was prohibited in using the 'Standard' name in other states. In nearby states, it used the Boron brand name (introduced in 1954) instead, but with an otherwise-similar logo. Wallace Trevor Holliday was President of the company from 1928 to 1949 and Chairman of the Board from 1949 until his death on November 7, 1950.

In 1968, Sohio's CEO, Charles E. Spahr (Charlie), arranged a merger with BP. It was announced as Standard's acquisition of BP's North American interests in exchange for BP receiving 25% of Sohio's stock. However, the contract included a stipulation that BP would assume majority interest when Standard's share of production from the Prudhoe Bay oilfield in Alaska reached 600,000 barrels per day (95,000 m^{3}/d). That occurred in 1978, and BP then took control of Standard Oil. The U.S. operations were unified under the BP America corporate name.

By 1991, BP had rebranded all Sohio and Boron retail stations as 'BP', except for some marine fuel outlets.

In 2011, a BP station in Steubenville, Ohio, that had originally opened as a Sohio station in 1946 ended fuel sales and was restored to 1970s vintage Sohio colors as a museum for Sohio. The site has vintage (inoperable) Sohio pumps and other Sohio memorabilia. The garage itself remains active.

== Stations ==
By 1980, Sohio and Boron had 3,400 gas stations in Ohio, Michigan, Pennsylvania, Indiana, Kentucky and West Virginia. Sohio acquired 5,660 former Gulf stations as a result of FTC anti-trust limitations in Chevron's 1985 takeover of Gulf. These stations, bought for $1 billion, were in Alabama, Georgia, Kentucky, Mississippi, Tennessee, North Carolina and South Carolina. Sohio was allowed to use the "Gulf" name for five years after the acquisition.

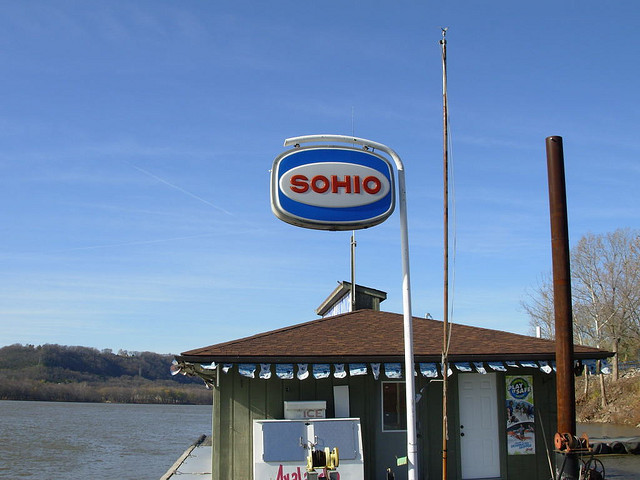
BP continues to sell marine fuel under the Sohio brand at various marinas on Ohio waterways and in Ohio state parks in order to protect its rights in the Sohio and Standard Oil names. The Anderson Ferry Marina near Cincinnati, Ohio as of 2005

By the end of 1985, all other Standard Oil descendants had minimized use of the name Standard, following Standard Oil of Indiana renaming itself Amoco earlier in the year as well as Chevron's aforementioned merger with Gulf that same year that led to its official corporate name to change from Standard Oil of California to Chevron Corporation. As a result, The Standard Oil Company (Ohio) corporately rebrand itself in 1986 under the Standard name, while continuing to use the Sohio brand in Ohio. In 1987, BP bought the 45% of Sohio it did not already own for $7.82 Billion and assumed control. Among the first changes was the rebranding of all Sohio, Boron, & Gulf stations that it owned to 'BP' in 1991. Among the conversions included former Mobil stations in Western Pennsylvania (including Pittsburgh) that Standard of Ohio acquired in 1987 when Mobil left that market, most of which had just rebranded as Boron when they were converted to BP. From 1989 to 1991, many Sohio, Boron and Gulf stations used BP's color scheme of green and yellow during the transitional rebranding to BP.

The Boron name was used outside of Ohio in neighboring states, like Michigan, Pennsylvania, Kentucky, and West Virginia. Boron also branded its premium-grade gasoline, along with its regular-grade fuel "Extron" (formerly "X-tane," later "Octron") and its unleaded version "Cetron," introduced in 1970.

Standard Oil's motor oil brands included Boron, Sohio, Cetron, CHD, Duron, Multron, Nitrex, Nitron, Octron, Premex, and Qvo.

Sohio's credit cards, like other oil company cards at the time, could be used at competitors' stations outside the issuing company's competitive territory, which in Sohio's case was Ohio. The benefit died with the Sohio brand. Exxon had a similar arrangement as well. In 1916, Sohio introduced a prefabricated canopy prototype for its stations. Although Sohio gas stations have ceased to exist, a few marina gas stations on Lake Erie and the Ohio River still bear the Sohio name.

When BP merged with Amoco in 1998, its American headquarters moved from the former BP America Building on Public Square in Cleveland to Chicago. Its American headquarters have since moved to the Houston Energy Corridor in Houston, Texas, in line with the corporate offices of Shell and fellow Standard spinoffs ConocoPhillips and Marathon Oil.

== Subsidiaries ==
=== Hospitality Motor Inns ===
Hospitality Motor Inns, a wholly owned Sohio subsidiary, operated 11 motor inns in Ohio and surrounding states The company was formed in 1963 as a Sohio subsidiary. Hospitality became a publicly held company when Sohio sold off 51% of the company to the public. Sohio sold its remaining interest of the chain to Hosmin, Inc., in 1978.

=== ProCare ===
In the 1980s, as many gas stations began converting their vehicle service bays into convenience stores, Sohio wished to continue performing auto maintenance by launching a specialty auto repair shop. Called Sohio ProCare, these shops were often located near Sohio stations that now had convenience stores instead of auto service, and they were more specialized than traditional auto garages at gas stations. The locations were mostly in Ohio, but Sohio expanded the concept into Pennsylvania and North Carolina, where they were known as "Boron ProCare." Also, unlike many Sohio stations, the ProCare locations were owned and operated directly by Sohio. Commercials for ProCare often featured M*A*S*H actor Gary Burghoff as "That Sohio Guy", as part of a larger Sohio advertising campaign featuring Burghoff. Burghoff himself would stay with BP for a time as a spokesperson after BP converted Sohio and its other brands to BP.

BP retained ProCare after absorbing Sohio, rebranding it as "BP ProCare" and changing the colors in its logo to match BP. BP continued to operate it until selling the chain to a private investment group in 1999, at which point the shops were simply called ProCare without an oil company prefix and its logo reverted to its Sohio-era colors. Following a bankruptcy under the private investment group's ownership, ProCare would ultimately be acquired by Monro Muffler Brake in 2006, and converted the locations to its own brands.

== In popular culture ==
From 1932 to 1985, Standard Oil of Ohio (Sohio) sponsored hundreds of consumer-facing films, radio programs, and newspaper columns designed to get the public up and driving, buying Sohio products, and using Sohio service stations. Many of the programs were objective, informative documentaries and travelogues, often with only the subtlest glimpse of the company that paid for them.

Most programs were part of a series titled “Let’s Explore Ohio.” From the 1940s until he retired in 1967, Edward Plumb of Sohio was responsible for the “Let’s Explore Ohio film series.

Sohio was a prolific producer and distributor of sponsored films from the 1930s into the 1980s. For many of those years, Sohio ran a free film distribution library for schools, civic organizations, and institutions. In the 1940s, Sohio had a staff of three projectionists touring the state to present movies in the Sohio library.

Sohio Is On the Air (1932) focused on two important industries of that time: radio broadcasting and tire manufacturing. Wilding Picture Productions in Chicago made the film.

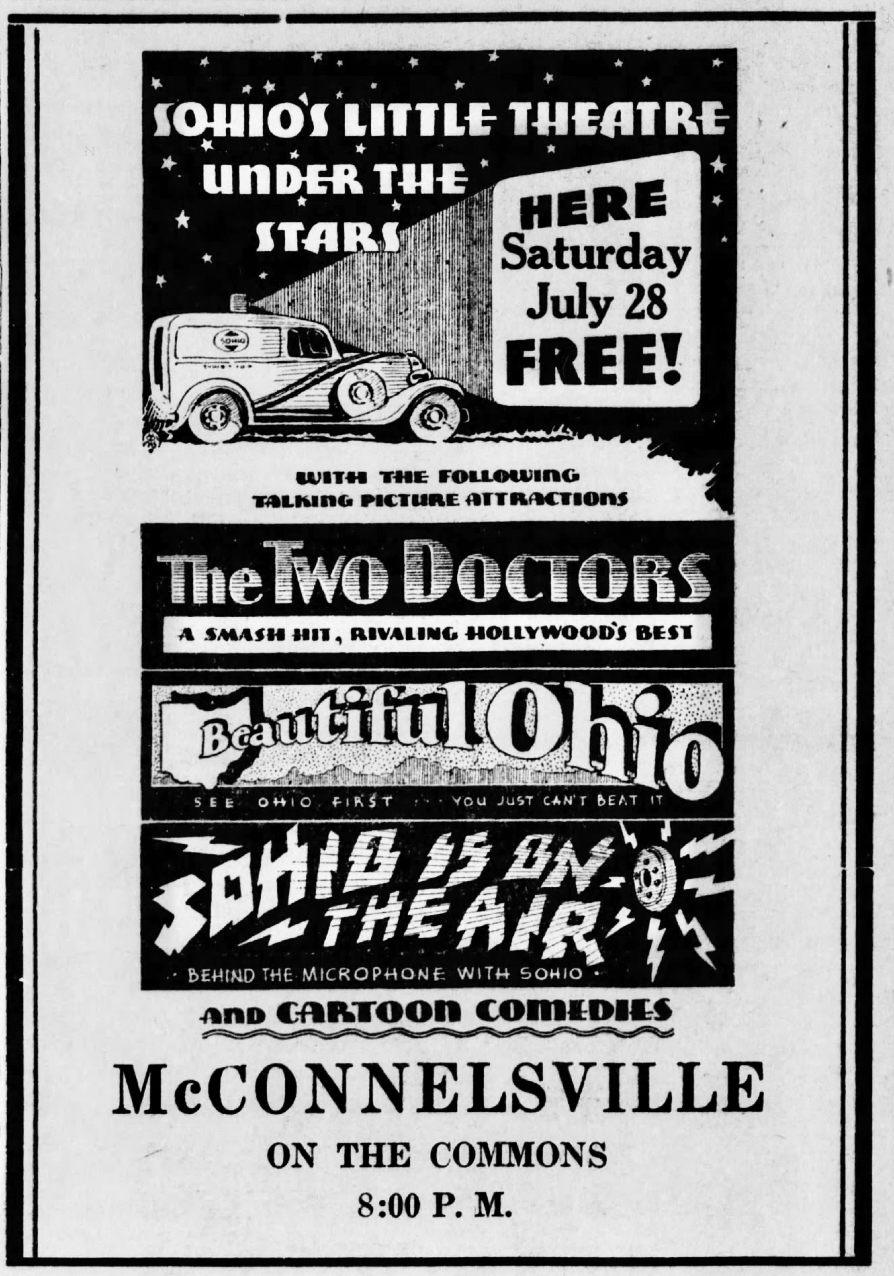
“The Little Theatre under the Stars” traveled from city to city in a specially designed truck.

In 1932, Sohio launched a traveling outdoor talking picture show called “The Little Theatre under the Stars.” The show traveled from city to city in a specially designed motor truck equipped to project sound motion pictures. Through an ingenious device, the pictures were projected through an opening in the truck's rear onto a mirror, then reflected to a large screen attached high above the truck’s front bumper. The screen was translucent, so the film could be watched from two directions. Attendance was free, and the features they showed were mostly Sohio films.

The Two Doctors (1934) told the story of a young man, the son of a doctor, who learns to cure automobile ailments by attending a Standard Oil service school. The film aired in the Sohio “Little Theatre Under the Stars.”

Beautiful Ohio (1934) was a two-reel feature shown at the Sohio “Little Theatre Under the Stars.” Scenes in the film included Ohio’s famous caverns, aerial views of the Y-bridge in Zanesville, and the Serpent Mound in Adams County, Ohio, the largest serpent effigy in the world.

“Beautiful Ohio” was chosen for the Crypt of Civilization, a room-sized time capsule, built between 1937 and 1940, at Oglethorpe University in Brookhaven, Georgia. The film was in good company. Producer David O. Selznick donated an original copy of the Gone With the Wind script to accompany the films included in the preservation effort.

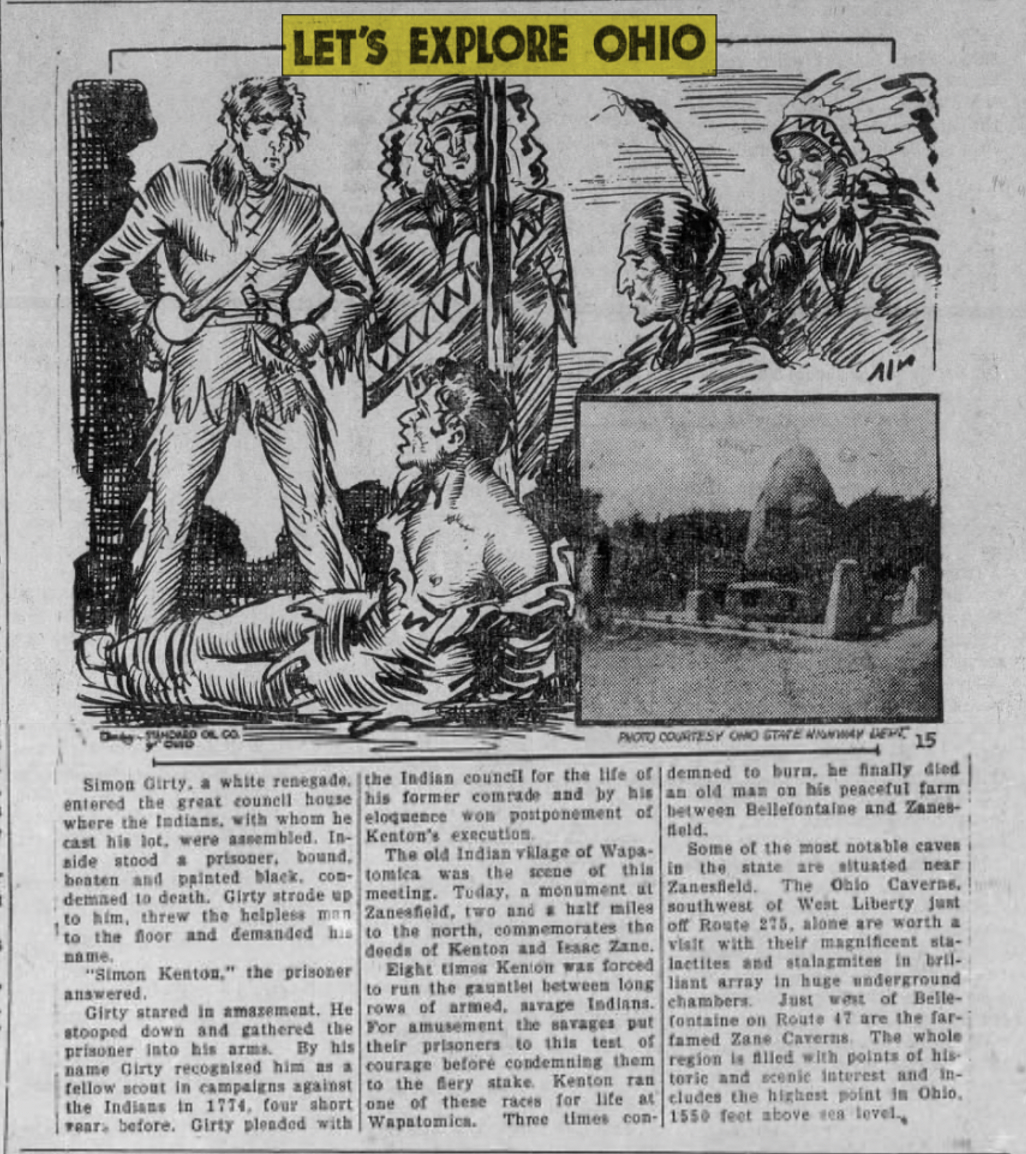
The SOHIO “Let’s Explore Ohio” newspaper series began in 1935

The Sohio newspaper column program began in 1935 with a weekly series of one-quarter-page illustrated newspaper columns about Ohio history. The only evidence that Sohio supplied the piece was the words “courtesy Standard Oil Company of Ohio” in small script, where the artist's signature would normally go at the bottom right of the etching illustrating the short story.

Ohio from the Air (1936) is thought to be the first picture taken entirely from an airplane. It took more than 2,500 miles of flying to take a bird’s-eye look at Ohio in the sound, black-and-white movie.

Ohio Sketch Book (1936) highlighted the work of the state highway patrol, the building of the world’s second-largest reflecting telescope, and other interesting events.

Wings Over the Crowd (1936) was filled with aerial thrills from the National Air Races.

In May 1938, Sohio launched a 32-part series of 15-minute historical radio dramas to further encourage Ohioans to get on the highway. The shows were written by Merrill Denison, originator of “Roses and Drums,” Cavalcade of America, “Romance of Canada,” and other radio dramas. The shows ran on ten Ohio Radio stations.

In 1938-39, Sohio commissioned ESCAR Motion Pictures, Inc. of Cleveland, Ohio, to produce a series of seven Let’s Explore Ohio films: Ohio at Play, Historical Ohio, Industrial Ohio, Ohio from the Air, Ohio Trails, Beautiful Ohio, and Sohio Sketch Book.

In 1937 and 38, "Historical Ohio," "Ohio from the Air," Safe Driving, and Wings Over Ohio were shown in the air-conditioned Sohio auditorium in the Varied Industries Building of the Great Lakes Exposition in Cleveland.

In 1938, Sohio sponsored The Ohio Country, a 16-minute black-and-white documentary. Narrated by George W. Schrail and produced by ESCAR Motion Picture Service, the motion picture reenacted the 1787-1788 Ohio Company of Associates trek from Ipswich, Massachusetts, to Marietta, Ohio, culminating in the first permanent settlement in the Northwest Territory.

Industrial Ohio (1938), a 22-minute film, highlights the various industries that thrive in Ohio, including steel, coal, power, oil, shovels, stone, pottery, paper, publishing, machine tools, rubber, rayon, and shoes. ESCAR Motion Pictures produced the film.

'Let’s Explore Ohio Postcard Giveaway ' . In 1939, Sohio ran a promotion featuring a 16-card postcard series titled “Let’s Explore Ohio.” A new card was distributed every two weeks. Veteran Cleveland Plain Dealer writer Grace Goulder Isnat and retired PD photographer Edwin A. Vorpe helped choose the postcard subjects.

Ohio at Play (1939), a 17-minute black-and-white sound film, showed people enjoying themselves at various Ohio museums, zoos, and parks. The film critic from the Cleveland Plain Dealer, Ward Marsh, normally a critic of advertising films, wrote: “I am going to write about one set of reels I saw the other day and, more, I shall recommend them highly to you to see them at the first opportunity you may have.”

In 1940, the “Let’s Explore Ohio” series had an annual audience of over half a million people.

Oddities of Ohio Industry (1940) giving behind-the-scene shots of unusual manufacturing processes. Included are how glass blowing, the manufacture of plastic bowls, glass tablecloths, and pretzels.

Ohio Soldiers (1942). With special permission from the War Department, a Wilding Picture Productions film crew took “an accurate and complete cross section of daily life” of the 18,000 Ohioans at Camp Shelby in Hattiesburg, Mississippi and other military bases where a significant portion of Ohioans were stationed. The finished film was distributed to schools, clubs and organizations.

Ohio and Its Mineral Resources (1946) was the first “state film” sponsored by the U.S. Bureau of Mines to be produced in color. It featured the first colored views of underground mining shown anywhere. The film won an Oscar at the 1947 Cleveland Film Festival, the first film festival in the world to recognize the importance of sponsored films. The film was the 25th in the Let’s Explore Ohio Series.

Naturalist and videographer Karl Maslowski produced nine nature documentaries for Sohio. His first company project was Ohio Wildlife (1948), a 17-minute color educational film about two young boys and their uncle, a farmer. The farmer introduces the boys to the animals living in Ohio's forests and fields. An article on the making of the film was the cover story of the Oct. 1948 issue of The SOHIOAN, Standard Oil’s Company magazine. Cinécraft Productions produced the film.

SOHIO Autotours. In 1950, when the number of televisions in Ohio passed the half-million mark, Sohio launched a 13-film travelogue series that took viewers on a simulated trip down Ohio's highways. Eight Ohio TV stations in five major cities – Cleveland, Cincinnati, Columbus, Dayton, and Toledo – ran the programs. Each 15-minute black-and-white “armchair” tour featured the scenic, historic, commercial, and industrial spots of the state. Edward Plumb, director of the Sohio educational motion picture department, hired Cinécraft Productions to produce the films. Frank Siedel and other Storycraft writers wrote the scripts. Robert Welchans directed the films. The National Road (U.S. 40) is an example of the films in the series.

Freedom’s Proving Grounds (1953), a 40-minute documentary produced by Cinécraft Productions, was created to celebrate Ohio’s 150th anniversary and the Northwest Ordinance of 1787, a document that preceded the United States Constitution and was influential in Ohio’s development.

Nature’s Children (1953) was a 28-minute color documentary highlighting the animals of Ohio’s countryside.

Cloud Over Ohio (1954) is a 30-minute color documentary that highlights the importance of water conservation and control. The film was produced in support of the Ohio Forestry Association. It received awards nationwide. Karl Maslowski, at the time a naturalist and columnist for the Cincinnati Enquirer, and his associate, Woodrow Goodpaster, did the photography.

Milestones of Motoring (1954), a 30-minute film released in color and black-and-white and directed by Ray Culley and produced by Cinécraft Productions, focuses on Ohioans' contributions to the history of automobiles. Many famous early car brands, such as Winton, Packard, and Studebaker, were either first manufactured, designed, or generally had ties to Ohio. Emphasis is placed on transportation innovations from Ohio—the first drive-in gas station, Charles Kettering’s automobile and the first self-starter, the Fisher Brothers’ "Body by Fisher," Packard and his famous slogan “Ask a Man Who Owns One,” and the role of Standard Oil in developing automobile fuels. “Milestones of Motoring” is notable for the use of three Hollywood actors - Joe E. Brown, Merv Griffin, and Rita Farrell- in the starring roles.

Ohio U.S.A. (1956) is a 28-minute color travelogue that explores Ohio’s cities, parks, farms, industries, and other features that have shaped the state.

Ohio’s Golden Harvest (1957) is a 30-minute documentary that focuses on life on a farm throughout all four seasons.

Beautiful Birds of Ohio (1958) was the 23rd film in Sohio’s Let’s Explore Ohio series.

In the 1960s, Sohio funded several more films by nature photographer Karl Maslowski. The Survivors (1960) dealt with animal and bird life. Ohio Out of Doors (1963), a 30-minute documentary featuring Lake Erie, the Ohio River, and other Ohio waterways, and Ohio Fishing Fever (1960), a 30-minute documentary on the size and importance of the fishing industry in Ohio and the kinds of fish found in Ohio.

Batter Up (1960) is a 28minute sports film in color. Sponsored by Sohio, the film shows the Do's and Dont's of playing different positions on a baseball team.

Empire within an Empire (1966) is a 30-minute color film about Ohio's industrial production and the state's scenic beauty. Ohio, the 35th state in size, ranks third in industrial production, 11th in agricultural income, 10th in mineral production, 4th in shipping, fifth in population, 6th in coal production, and 3rd in electric-power production.

Ohio Heritage Series (1967). Sohio hired Cinécraft to produce the series to help promote the growth of educational television. 80,000 teacher’s guides were printed and distributed with the series. The films were played in schools with ETV capability and aired on educational TV stations in the evenings so home viewers with UHF capability could watch the movies. Warren Guthrie, Director of Public Relations for Sohio, narrated them.

The Projection ’70 film series was a part of a special program to help commemorate Standard Oil’s 100th anniversary. The series presented what the experts thought the years ahead would be like in six areas: Communication, Education, Agriculture, Medicine, Transportation, and Urban Systems.

Oil from the Great Land (1976) celebrated the construction of the Trans-Alaskan Pipeline System, which stretched from Prudhoe Bay to Valdez. The 28-minute color documentary-style film was about the critical need to bring 9.5 billion barrels of crude oil from Alaska's North Slope to oil-hungry U.S. markets.

Sohio… for Today and Tomorrow (1979) is a film about the completion of the Alaska pipeline, which Sohio led, and how Sohio grew by deploying the tons of cash from Alaskan oil. Sohio owned and managed a large fleet of oil tankers, bought coal companies both deep and strip. They had transformed into an energy company. Directed by Neil McCormick of Cinécraft and written by Larry Adams, the film is narrated by various Sohio employees.

Where the River Enters the Sea (1982) is thought to be the last filmed consumer-facing film sponsored by Sohio. Non-professional native Alaskans acted in every role. The film was distributed to PBS TV stations across the country.

The film portrays a small Eskimo community facing the challenges of modern life while maintaining a devout respect for ancient traditions. Told from the Eskimos’ perspective, the fictional story begins with the death of a respected village elder. The camera follows members of the elder's family as they attend the funeral and return to their everyday lives. The film was produced as a public service for the Eskimo-owned NANA Regional Corporation, a native Alaskan regional corporation. The studio crew spent two months in Alaska scouting and filming.

Neil McCormick of Cinécraft Productions directed the film. The film won a Classic Telly Award in 2004, a Cine Golden Eagle, and a Public Relations Society of America (PRSA) Bronze Anvil award.

The growth of the television industry and the advent of cheap video players saw a gradual decline in the use of films in schools. In addition, greater centralization and tightening of the school curriculum meant teachers had less leeway to include commercially produced material unless it targeted the core curriculum.

== Leadership ==
=== President ===
1. John Davison Rockefeller, 1870–1900
2. Ambrose Morrison McGregor, 1900–1901
3. Frank Quarles Barstow, 1901–1908
4. Henry Morgan Tilford, 1908–1911
5. Walter Clark Teagle, 1911
6. Andrew Palmer Coombe, 1911–1928
7. Wallace Trevor Holliday, 1928–1949
8. Clyde Tanner Foster, 1949–1957
9. Charles Eugene Spahr, 1957–1969
10. Alton Winslow Whitehouse Jr., 1970–1977
11. Joseph Durham Harnett, 1977–1980
12. John Robert Miller, 1980–19??

=== Chairman of the Board ===
1. Wallace Trevor Holliday, 1949–1950
2. Armstrong Alexander Stambaugh, 1950–1955
3. Clyde Tanner Foster, 1956–1961
4. Charles Eugene Spahr, 1970–1977
5. Alton Winslow Whitehouse Jr., 1978–1986
6. Sir Robert Baynes Horton, 1986–1987

== Gallery ==
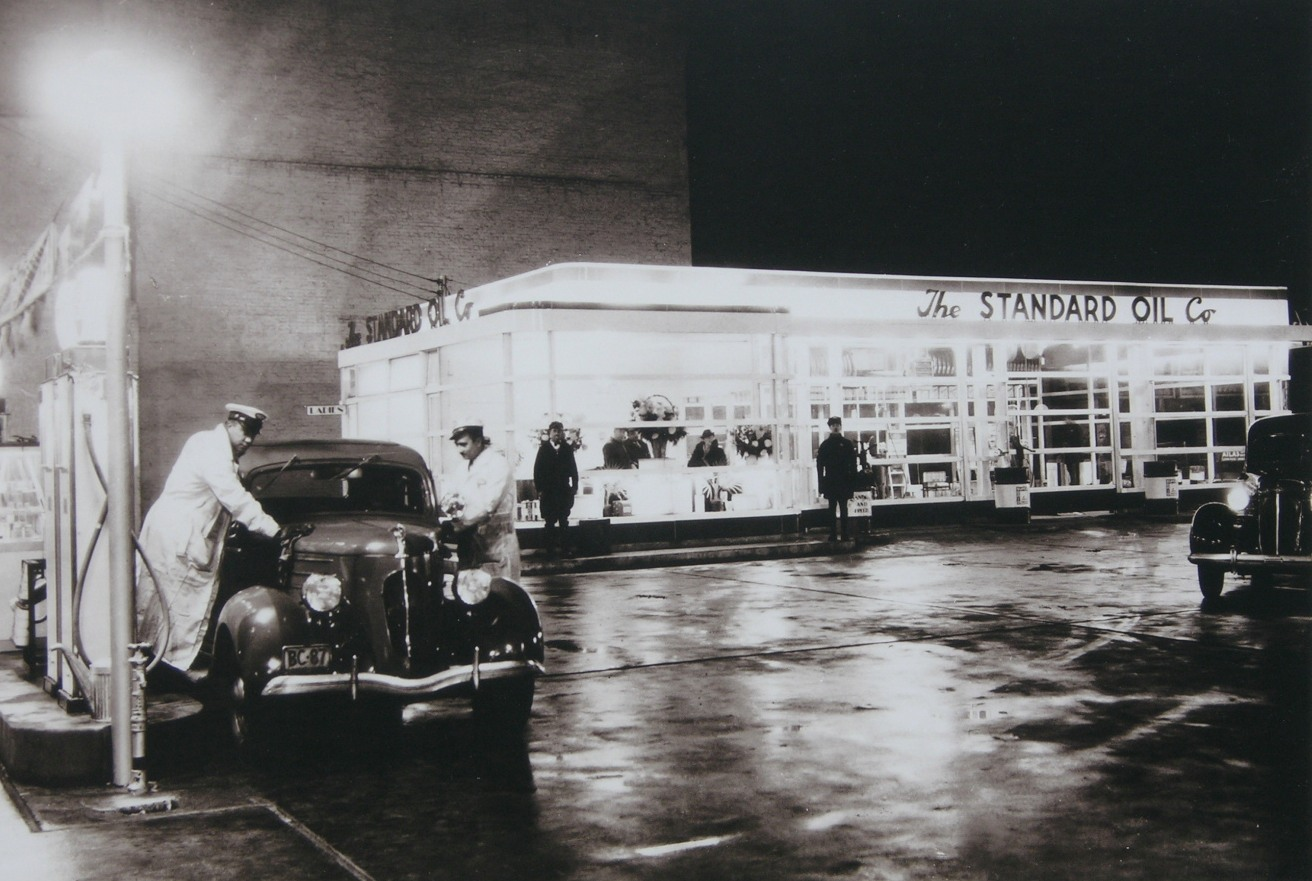
Sohio service station in Cleveland, Ohio (ca. 1936)

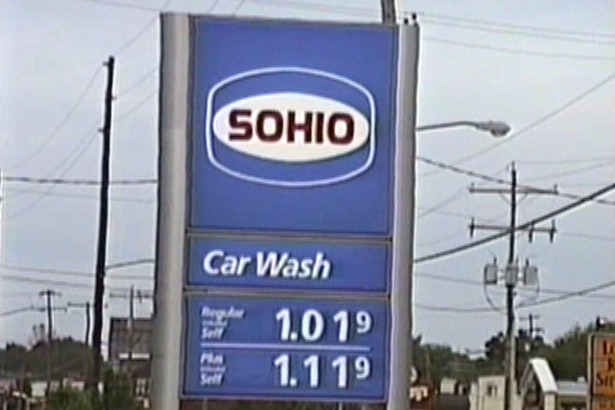
Sohio sign circa 1989. Sohio's logo. A similar logo was also used at Boron stations outside the state of Ohio

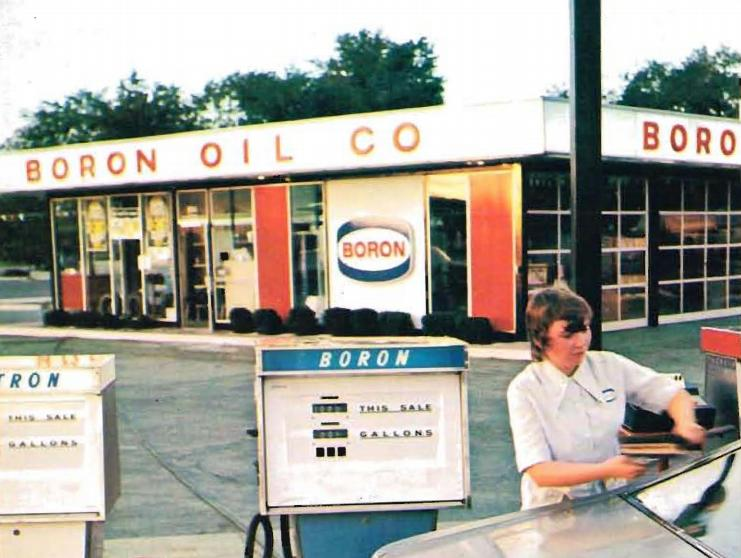
Sohio Boron gasoline station (1972). Sohio marketed gasoline under various brand names in other states, including Boron, BP, Gas & Go, Gulf, Gibbs and William Penn

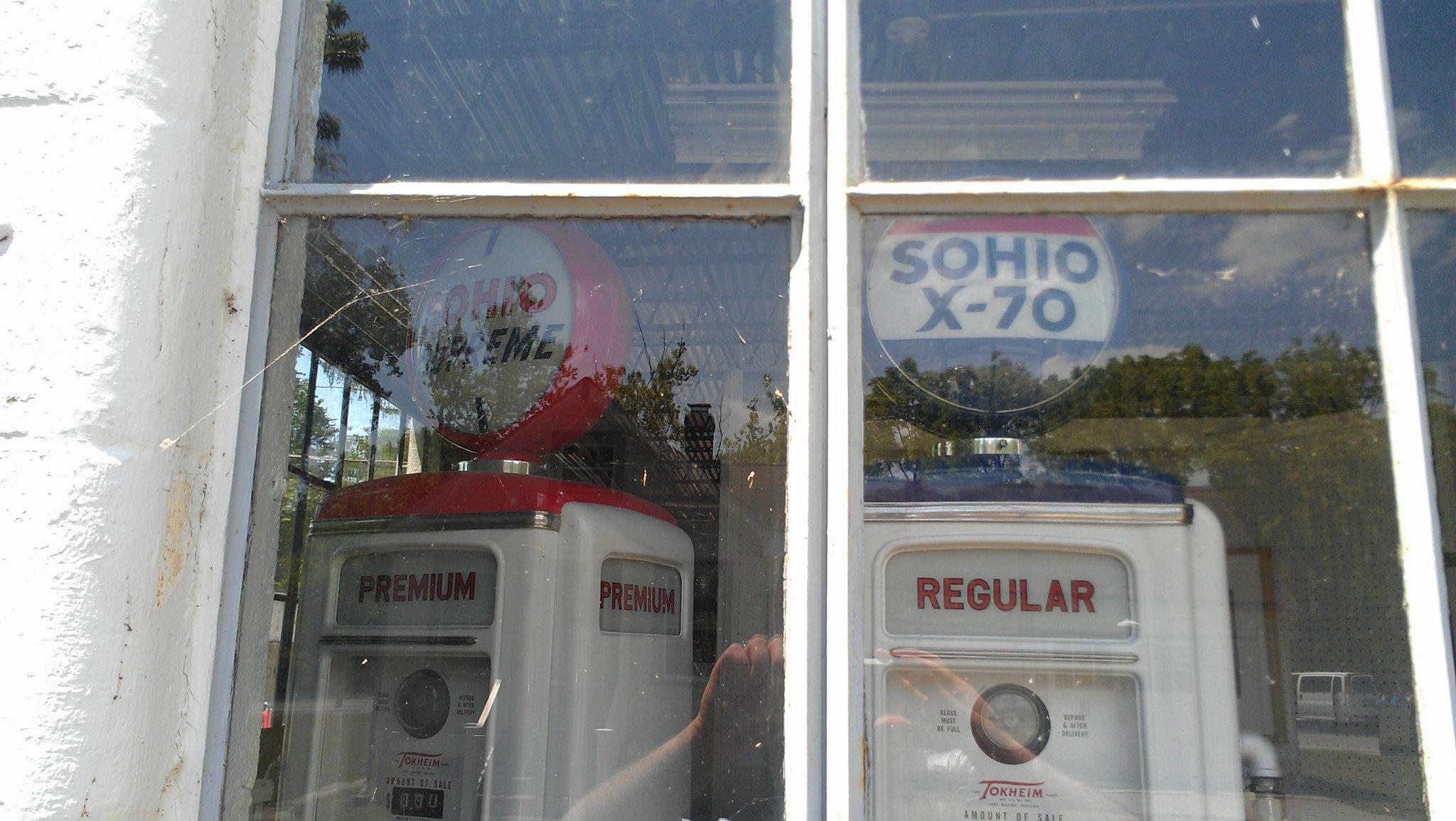
Vintage Sohio pump in storage at Cuyahoga Valley National Park near Richfield, Ohio

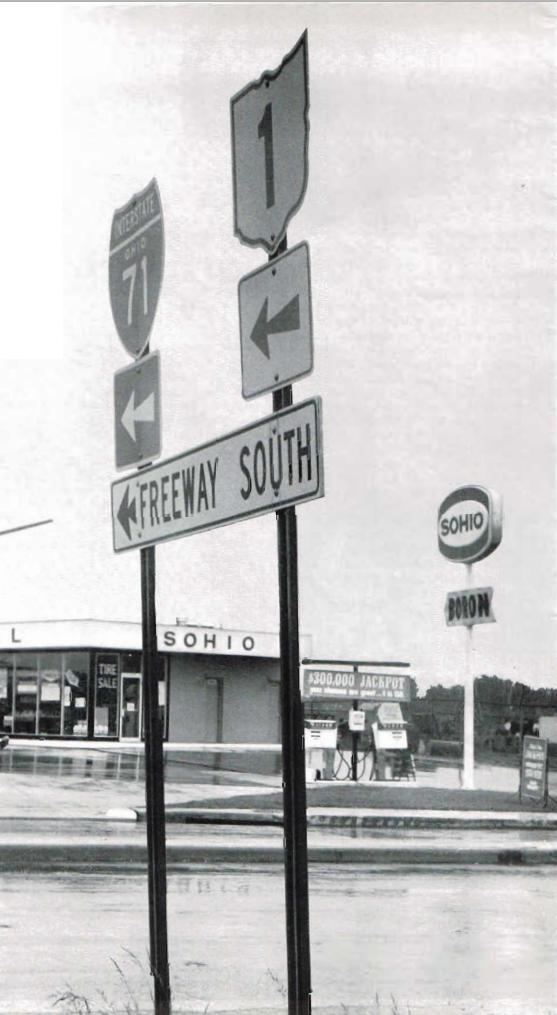
Columbus-area highway marker designating Interstate 71 and Ohio Route 1 (1965)
