= Georgia Lloyd =

American author, peace activist and world government advocate

- Born: September 5, 1913; Winnetka, Illinois, U.S.
- Died: February 18, 1999 (aged 85)
- Occupations: peace activist, author, philanthropist, and world government advocate
- Title: Co-founder of Campaign for World Government
- Parents: William Bross Lloyd (father); Lola Maverick Lloyd (mother)
- Relatives: Jessie Lloyd O'Connor (sister); William Bross Lloyd Jr. (brother); Mary Maverick Lloyd (sister)

Georgia Lloyd (September 5, 1913 – February 18, 1999) was an American pacificist, peace activist, author, philanthropist, and world government advocate active in the realm of civil liberties and international peace efforts during the 20th century. Born into a family deeply entrenched in social activism, with social and political prestige at the time, she was the daughter of Lola Maverick Lloyd.

Lloyd was a prominent figure in the mid-20th century, advocating for international cooperation and a democratic union of nations. She co-founded the Campaign for World Government and was executive secretary from 1943 to 1990. She participated in the formation of the United Nations in 1945.

== Early life ==
Georgia Lloyd was born on September 5, 1913, in Winnetka, Illinois. She descended from a lineage of figures who were influential in American political and social history at the time. Her paternal ancestry included William Bross, co-founder of the Chicago Tribune and acting governor of Illinois, and Henry Demarest Lloyd, a recognized advocate for social reform. On her maternal side, she was related to Samuel Augustus Maverick, a signatory of the Texas Declaration of Independence. She was the fourth child of pacifist Lola Maverick Lloyd and William Bross Lloyd, heir to the Chicago Tribune. The Lloyd family was deeply involved in civic responsibilities, dating back to Georgia's grandfather, Henry Demarest Lloyd. Their home, named Wayside, stands as a National Historic Landmark.

Raised amidst discussions on civil liberties, peace, labor rights, and international relations, Lloyd was nurtured in an environment promoting civic duty and activism. Following her parents' divorce in 1916, she moved across various residences, spending formative years in the US and Switzerland, where she attended the International Fellowship School.

Lloyd earned a degree in political science from the University of Chicago in 1937.

== Career and activism ==
Lloyd's activism began in her college years, lobbying for the Equal Nationality Bill in 1934 and supporting Norman Thomas's presidential campaign. Throughout her life, Lloyd was an advocate for socialism, undeterred even during the McCarthy era. She was involved in various organizations like the Chicago Civil Liberties Committee, the Keep America Out of War Congress (1941-1942), and the Socialist Party of Chicago.

In December 1937, alongside Hungarian pacifist Rosika Schwimmer and her mother Lola, she co-founded the Campaign for World Government (CWG). She took on the role of executive secretary for CWG in 1943, a position she held until her death in 1999. During her tenure, she attended the 1945 United Nations conference and represented CWG in numerous other international forums. She co-authored Searchlight on Peace Plans: Choose Your Road to World Government with Edith Wynner, propounding the idea of a world government as a pathway to sustainable peace. Reportedly, Eleanor Roosevelt kept a copy of Searchlight on Peace Plans on her bedside table.

== See also ==
- List of peace activists
- Campaign for World Government (CWG)
- World government
