= Lola Maverick Lloyd House =

Historic house in Illinois, United States

- U.S. National Register of Historic Places
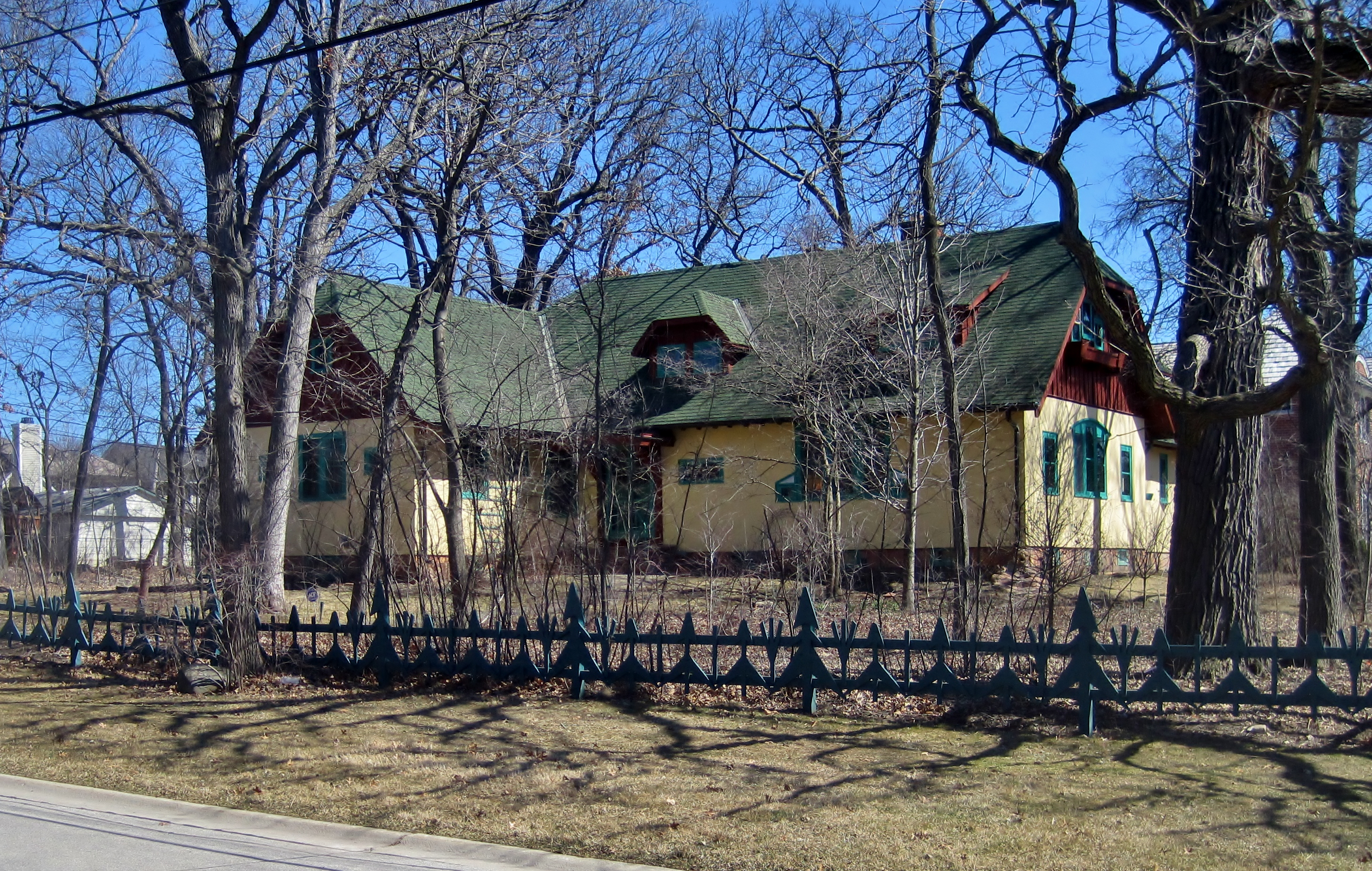

- Location within Chicago metropolitan area Location within Illinois Location within the United States
- Location: 455 Birch St., Winnetka, Illinois
- Coordinates: 42°06′21″N 87°44′12″W
- Area: less than one acre
- Built: 1920
- Architect: Charles Haag
- Architectural style: Arts & Crafts
- NRHP reference No.: 05001606
- Added to NRHP: February 1, 2006

The Lola Maverick Lloyd House is a historic house at 455 Birch Street in Winnetka, Illinois. The house was built in 1920 for pacifist and feminist activist Lola Maverick Lloyd and her four children. At the time, Lloyd had recently undergone a public divorce from William Bross Lloyd; while she expressed a desire to move back to Texas, where she had grown up, her custody agreement required her to stay in Illinois. Architect Charles Haag designed the house with the assistance of Lloyd herself; their design is in the Arts and Crafts style and includes influences from both Texas and Haag's native Sweden.

The house has a distinctive red, cream, turquoise and teal color scheme and features carved wooden decorations inspired by animals and nature, gable ends with board-and-batten siding, and shed-roofed dormers projecting from the roof. While she often rented it while traveling to Europe to advance her activist work, Lloyd considered the house her home until her death in 1944, and it remained in her family for the rest of the twentieth century.

The house was added to the National Register of Historic Places on February 1, 2006.
