= Jessie Lloyd O'Connor =

1904-1988, journalist and social activist

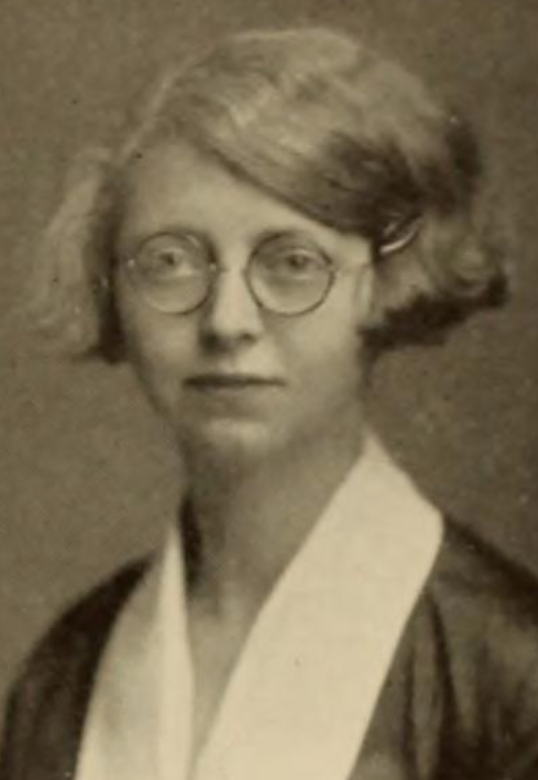
- Jessie Bross Lloyd, from the 1925 Smith College yearbook
- Born: Jessie Bross Lloyd; February 14, 1904; Winnetka, Illinois, US
- Died: December 24, 1988 (aged 84); Fall River, Massachusetts, US
- Education: Smith College
- Occupation: Journalist
- Spouse: Harvey O'Connor
- Parents: William Bross Lloyd (father); Lola Maverick Lloyd (mother)
- Relatives: Henry Demarest Lloyd

Jessie Lloyd O'Connor (1904-1988) was a journalist, social reformer and political activist. She worked as a reporter for Federated Press. O'Connor served and supported numerous progressive organizations, including the American League Against War and Fascism and the ACLU.

== Family and early life ==
Jessie Lloyd, journalist and social activist, was born in Winnetka, Illinois on February 14, 1904, the daughter of William Bross Lloyd, writer and socialist, and Lola Maverick Lloyd, pacifist and founder of the U.S. section of the Women's International League for Peace and Freedom (WILPF). O'Connor's grandfather was Henry Demarest Lloyd, muckraking journalist and author of Wealth Against Commonwealth (1894), an exposé of Standard Oil. Her family's strong tradition of democratic socialism provided the foundation of a political education that was augmented by a constant stream of visiting radicals and reformers, including Jane Addams, Rosika Schwimmer, and John Reed. In 1915, Lloyd accompanied her mother to Europe aboard Henry Ford's Peace Ship.

== Education and career ==
After earning an A.B. in economics from Smith College in 1925, Lloyd visited London where she witnessed a confrontation between police and strikers during the British General Strike. Inaccurate news reports of the incident confirmed her parents' contention that mainstream press accounts of the poor were untrustworthy. A short stint working in a Paris factory reinforced her desire to provide a corrective to slanted news coverage by reporting events herself.

Lloyd contributed stories to newspapers in the United States while working as a correspondent for the London Daily Herald in Geneva (1926) and Moscow (1926–28). From Moscow, she also sent stories to the Federated Press, a labor wire service in the United States.

From 1929 to 1935 Lloyd worked as a reporter for the Federated Press in the United States. She was sent to Gastonia, North Carolina in 1929 to cover the National Textile Workers Union's attempt to organize the Loray mill. She wrote a pamphlet on the strike, Gastonia: A Graphic Chapter in Southern Organization (1930).

Early in the Depression O'Connor wrote stories about the unemployed in New York City. Her exposure to the plight of the jobless under capitalism and the activities of the Communist Party on their behalf fostered an appreciation for Communists' courage and dedication. Over time she became disenchanted with the Party, finding it doctrinaire and fraught with internecine battles. Though she declined to join, O'Connor never became part of the anticommunist camp within the American left. In 1957, she wrote of her accord with communist aims of "world peace, race brotherhood, [and] equality for women" but added that she "could not favor dictatorship of the proletariat or trust anybody with power, without guarantees of civil liberties for opponents."

In 1930, Jessie Lloyd married Harvey O'Connor, an editor for the Federated Press, and a former logger, seaman, and member of the Industrial Workers of the World. The O'Connors decided to open a bureau of the Federated Press in Pittsburgh where the labor movement, in attempting to organize the steel mills and mining companies, was fighting its most bitter struggle. First, they took a six-month trip to the Caribbean and Mexico, filing stories from each region they visited.

In 1931, the Federated Press sent Jessie Lloyd O'Connor to replace a correspondent who had been shot while covering the coal miners' strike in Harlan County, Kentucky. Despite regular threats, she turned interviews with miners, their families, and members of the community into evocative stories carried in newspapers throughout the country. Her investigation of the murder of two men conducting a soup kitchen for the strikers left an indelible impression which she described in the O'Connors' 1987 memoir: "Class struggle is not something I want to preach, it is something that happens to people who try to resist or improve intolerable conditions."

After returning to Pittsburgh, O'Connor continued working for the Federated Press and helped revitalize the local ACLU. She also helped research and edit the first in a series of Harvey's exposes of American capitalism, Mellon's Millions (1933), a role she played for his subsequent books.

The O'Connors went to Moscow in 1932 to work for the English language Moscow Daily News. Jessie was troubled by the changes in Russia since 1928 and unhappy translating dull stories of "socialist triumphs in new paper mills and state farms." When libel litigation over Mellon's Millions was resolved in 1933, the O'Connors returned to Pittsburgh where workers, guaranteed the right to organize by the National Recovery Act, were forming union locals throughout the steel industry. While reporting for the Federated Press from 1933 to 1935, O'Connor carried messages between organizers. During the Ambridge strike she narrowly escaped arrest, and smuggled the main organizer out of town. During this period she also chaired the Pittsburgh chapter of the American League Against War and Fascism.

An heir to the Chicago Tribune fortune, O'Connor believed it was her duty to use her money to benefit radical causes. In 1934, she received publicity for demanding at a stockholders' meeting that U.S. Steel recognize a union of its employees. She helped fund many projects, from literacy and voting campaigns in the South to radical bookstores.

Although she continued to work periodically as a freelance journalist, in 1936, O'Connor turned her energies to volunteer work and later, caring for two children the O'Connors adopted in the early 1940s. From 1939 to 1944 they lived at Hull House. While in Chicago, Jessie was general secretary of The League of Women Shoppers, working to organize buying power to improve workplace conditions and wages. For the Metropolitan Housing and Planning Council she made a film of housing conditions designed to convince her former Winnetka neighbors to finance improvements. She also worked for the Industrial Board of the YWCA, the ACLU, Spanish Refugee Relief, the American Committee for the Protection of the Foreign Born, WILPF, and the Campaign for World Government. O'Connor claimed she served on so many boards during this period that she did justice to none of them.

In 1945, the O'Connors moved to Fort Worth, Texas where Harvey worked as publicity director for the Oil Workers International Union. In 1948, they settled in Little Compton, Rhode Island, where Harvey devoted himself to writing. Jessie was a member of the National Committee of the Progressive Party from 1949 to 1952 and a delegate to the People's World Constitutional Convention in 1950. During the 1950s, Joseph McCarthy accused both O'Connors of being Communists. Harvey was called before the House Un-American Activities Committee and Jessie's passport was revoked. They joined with other activists to organize the National Committee to Abolish HUAC (later the National Committee Against Repressive Legislation). From the 1960s on, Jessie demonstrated against the Vietnam War, was active in political campaigns, worked against construction of a local nuclear power plant, and traveled extensively.
