= Emma Thomas (disambiguation) =

Emma Thomas (born 1971) is a British film producer.

Emma Thomas may also refer to:

- Emma Thomas (Quaker) (1872–1960), English schoolteacher
- Emma Thomas (rugby union) (born 1958), New Zealand rugby union player
