= Harvey O'Connor =

American journalist, editor, and activist

- Born: March 29, 1897; Minneapolis, Minnesota
- Died: August 29, 1987 (aged 90); Little Compton, Rhode Island
- Occupations: Journalist, activist, author
- Years active: 1915–1964
- Known for: Activist in 1919 Seattle General Strike
- Notable work: Memoirs about early 20th Century politics in Washington state
- Political party: CPUSA
- Movement: Communist, Socialist
- Spouse: Jessie Lloyd O'Connor

Harvey O'Connor (29 March 1897 – 29 August 1987) was an American radical journalist, newspaper editor, author, and political activist. The author of nearly a dozen books in his lifetime, O'Connor is best remembered for his activity in the 1919 Seattle General Strike and as a memoirist about early 20th Century politics in Washington state.

== Biography ==
=== Early years ===
Harvey O'Connor was born March 29, 1897, in Minneapolis, Minnesota, the son of a railway cook. He attended public school in neighboring St. Paul before relocating with his family to Tacoma, Washington, where he completed high school in 1914.

Owing to the death of his father and his mother's need for financial support, O'Connor went to work in various lumber camps as a logger after graduation rather than continuing his education. There he joined the Industrial Workers of the World, a radical industrial union espousing the doctrine of syndicalism — the overthrow of capitalism in favor of rule by industrially defined workers organizations.

=== Political career ===
O'Connor was the editor of the left wing Seattle Daily Call during its short-lived existence in 1917 and 1918. Thereafter, he took a position as the editor and business manager of the Farmer-Labor Call of Centralia, Washington.

During the 1919 Seattle General Strike which shut down the city for nearly a week during the month of February, O'Connor played a role producing leaflets and agitating on behalf of the strike. His activities caught the attention of the authorities, which subsequently indicted him for criminal anarchy. O'Connor was never brought to trial, however, owing to the loss of a test case by the state on a similar complaint.

In 1921, O'Connor went to work as a department editor at the Seattle Union Record, a daily produced by the Seattle labor movement under the editorship of his friend E.B. "Harry" Ault. He stayed with this paper until 1924.

In 1924, O'Connor left the Union Record to move to Cleveland, Ohio, to take a position as assistant editor of the Brotherhood of Locomotive Engineers' Journal, the monthly magazine of the BLE.

O'Connor next went to New York City in 1927 to head the New York bureau of the Federated Press, a left wing press agency which supplied material to newspapers of the labor movement and left wing political organizations around the country. He remained in this position until 1930. When he joined the newspaper, Whittaker Chambers later realized that "Harvey O'Connor was then effective editor of the Daily Worker."

=== Later years ===
In later years, O'Connor was a professional author, writing a number of non-fiction books accentuating the lifestyles of the rich and powerful and the difficult situation of the working class for commercial publishers. Some of his publications include Mellon's Millions, The Astors, The Guggenheims, History of the Oil Workers International, and The Empire of Oil.

O'Connor remained politically active throughout his life, serving as chairman of the Emergency Civil Liberties Committee from 1954 to 1963 and as chairman of the National Committee to Abolish the House Un-American Activities Committee in 1964.

O'Connor was a sponsor of the Fair Play for Cuba Committee.

In 1964, O'Connor published his memoirs, regarded by historians as an important work detailing the history of the radical movement of Washington state during the first decades of the 20th century.

== Personal and death ==
O'Connor married Jessie Lloyd O'Connor, a fellow journalist and social activist, born in Winnetka, Illinois, on February 14, 1904, and granddaughter of Henry Demarest Lloyd (1847–1903), a 19th-century American progressive political activist and pioneer muckraking journalist.

On August 29, 1987, he died of heart failure at his home in Little Compton, Rhode Island. (Jesse died a little over a year later on December 24, 1988, in Fall River, Massachusetts.)

== Legacy ==
O'Connor's papers reside at Brown University in Providence, Rhode Island.

== Works ==
- How Mellon Got Rich (New York: International Publishers, 1933)
- Mellon's Millions, the Biography of a Fortune: The Life and Times of Andrew W. Mellon (New York: John Day Co., 1933)
- Steel — Dictator (New York: John Day Co., 1935)
- The Guggenheims: The Making of an American Dynasty (New York: Covici Friede, 1937)
- The Astors (New York: Alfred A. Knopf, 1941)
- History of Oil Workers International Union (CIO) (Denver: Oil Workers International Union (CIO), 1950)
- The Empire of Oil (New York: Monthly Review Press, 1955)
- For Abolition of the Inquisitorial Committees of Congress: A Pamphlet (New York: Emergency Civil Liberties Committee, 1957)
- New Light on Iraq (London: Union of Democratic Control, n.d. [c. 1958])
- McCarthy Goes Marching On: An Appeal to the British Public (London: Union of Democratic Control, n.d. [c. 1960])
- World Crisis in Oil (New York: Monthly Review Press, 1962)
- Revolution in Seattle: A Memoir (New York: Monthly Review Press, 1964)

== Archives ==
- Harvey O'Connor Civil Liberties Collection, 1966-1972. John Hay Library, Brown University Library.
- Harvey O'Connor papers. circa 1936-1957. 1 pamphlet plus 1 file. At the Labor Archives of Washington, University of Washington Libraries Special Collections.
- Harvey O'Connor papers. circa 1919-1983. 76 linear feet. At Walter P. Reuther Library, Archives of Labor and Urban Affairs, Wayne State University.
