= Arthur Garfield Hays =

American lawyer (1881–1954)

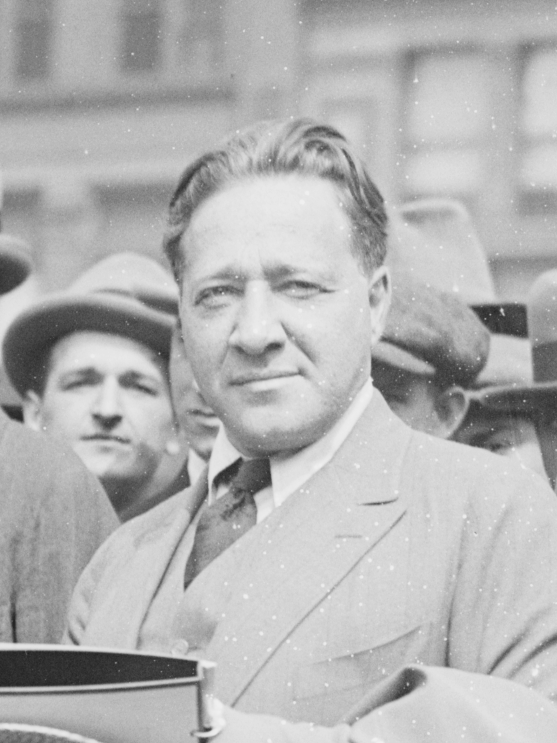
- Hays in 1924
- Born: December 12, 1881; Rochester, New York, U.S.
- Died: December 14, 1954 (aged 73)
- Education: Columbia University (BA, LLB)
- Occupation: Lawyer
- Years active: 1905–1950s
- Organization: American Civil Liberties Union (ACLU)
- Known for: civil liberties lawyer
- Notable work: defense in Scopes trial, Sacco and Vanzetti case, Scottsboro case, Reichstag trial case
- Movement: Progressive Party
- Spouse: Blanche Marks Hays 1908–1924 Aline Davis Hays (m. 1924; died 1944)

Arthur Garfield Hays (December 12, 1881 – December 14, 1954) was an American lawyer and champion of civil liberties issues, best known as a co-founder and general counsel of the American Civil Liberties Union and for participating in notable cases including the Sacco and Vanzetti trial. He was a member of the Committee of 48 and a contributor to The New Republic. In 1937, he headed an independent investigation of an incident in which 19 people were killed and more than 200 wounded in Ponce, Puerto Rico, when police fired at them. His commission concluded the police had behaved as a mob and committed a massacre.

== Early life and education ==
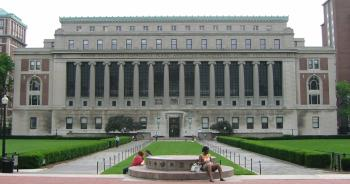
Columbia University.

Arthur Garfield Hays was born on December 12, 1881, in Rochester, New York. Three months earlier, the death of James A. Garfield had installed Chester A. Arthur in the U.S. presidency. His father and mother, both of German Jewish descent, belonged to prosperous families in the clothing manufacturing industry. In 1902, he graduated from Columbia College, where he was one of the early members of the Pi Lambda Phi fraternity. In 1905, he received an LLB from Columbia Law School and was admitted to the New York bar.

== Career ==
In 1905, Hays formed a law firm with two former classmates. He and his partners gained prominence during World War I representing interests of ethnic Germans in the US who were discriminated against because Germany was an enemy of the Allies during the war. In 1914–1915, he practiced law in London.

Hays was active in civil liberties issues. In 1920 (or as early as 1912), was hired as general counsel for the American Civil Liberties Union. From this point, his career had two tracks: he vigorously defended the individual liberty of victims of discriminatory laws, and he also kept private work. He became a wealthy lawyer who represented the interests of power and fame (his more prominent clients ranged from Wall Street brokers and best-selling authors to notorious gamblers and the Dionne quintuplets).

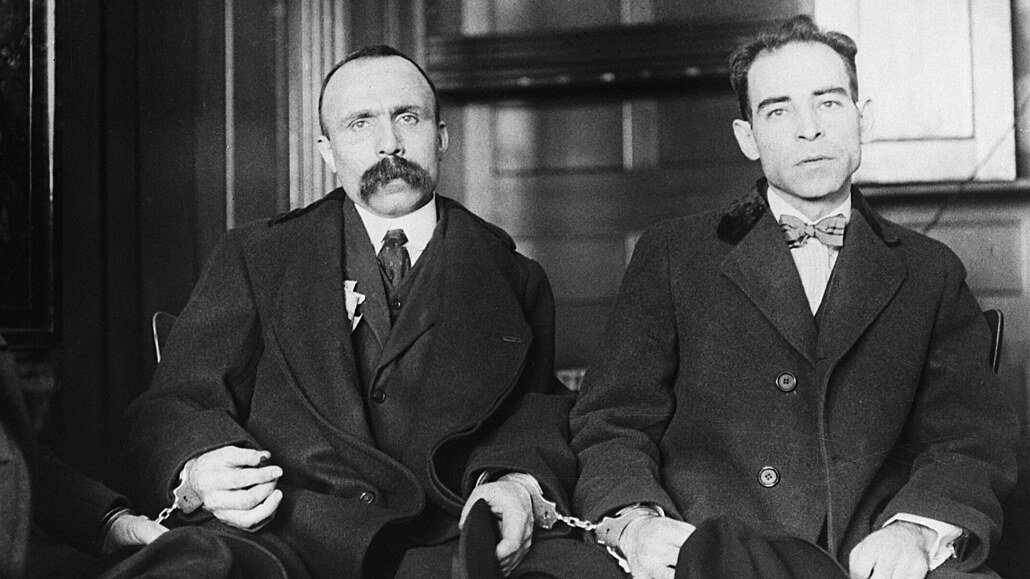
Controversial anarchist trial defendants Bartolomeo Vanzetti (left) and Nicola Sacco.

Hays took part in numerous notable cases, including the Sweet segregation case in Detroit as well as the Scopes trial (often called the "monkey trial") in 1925, in which a school teacher in Tennessee was tried for teaching evolution; the American Mercury censorship case (1926); the Sacco and Vanzetti case, in which two Italian anarchists in Boston were convicted and executed in 1927 for a murder they denied committing; and the Scottsboro case, in which eight black men from Alabama were convicted and sentenced to death in 1931 for allegedly attacking two white women. Hays attended the Reichstag trial in Berlin on behalf of Georgi Dimitrov, a Bulgarian Communist accused by the Nazis in 1933 of burning the Reichstag. He was also a member of an unofficial international commission of inquiry held in September 1933 in London, known as the Reichstag counter-trial.

Hays also defended labor. He defended coal miners in disputes in Pennsylvania and West Virginia (1922–1935), including the Anthracite Coal Strike of 1922. He defended right-to-strike cases against Jersey City mayor Frank "Boss" Hague. Furthermore, he defended British writer (and CPGB member) John Strachey against deportation. Hays led the plaintiff in Emerson Jennings vs. Commonwealth of Pennsylvania conspiracy case. He represented the Jehovah's Witnesses and argued for the right not to salute the American flag.

In 1937, Hays was appointed to lead an independent investigation with a group (called the "Hays Commission") to study an incident in which 18 people were killed and more than 200 wounded in Ponce, Puerto Rico, when police opened fire on them. They had gathered for a parade for which the permits had been withdrawn at the last minute. His commission concluded the police had behaved as a mob and committed a massacre.

From 1939 to 1943, he represented sociologist Jerome Davis in a libel suit filed against Curtis Publishing, publishers of the Saturday Evening Post magazine and its reporter Benjamin Stolberg.

=== Film censorship case over Whirlpool of Desire ===
From the IMDB entry for Remous (France, 1935) directed by Edmond T. Greville:

Albany, New York - Monday, January 23, 1939: "The French film Remous was shown Friday [January 20] to five judges of the New York State Appellate Division in proceedings in the attempt by Arthur Mayer and Joseph Burstyn to get a license to screen it in New York State. The picture has twice been denied a license, first in August 1936, when it was rejected as being "indecent," "immoral," and tending to "corrupt morals." It was again rejected in November 1937. In March 1938, it was screened for the New York Board of Regents, which on April 14 disapproved application for a license. Hays, counsel for Mayer and Burstyn at yesterday's proceedings, ridiculed the objections of Irwin Esmond and the Regents to certain scenes, pointing out that the film was French and would appeal only to an educated audience. Counsel for the Regents based his plea on the film's theme of sex frustration, arguing that it would be unwise public policy to show it to all classes of people.

In November 1939, Mayer and Burstyn released the film in the US as Whirlpool of Desire. Film censorship in the United States was not overturned until the U.S. Supreme Court case, the Joseph Burstyn, Inc. v. Wilson (the "Miracle Decision") in 1952.

== Politics ==
=== Progressive Party ===
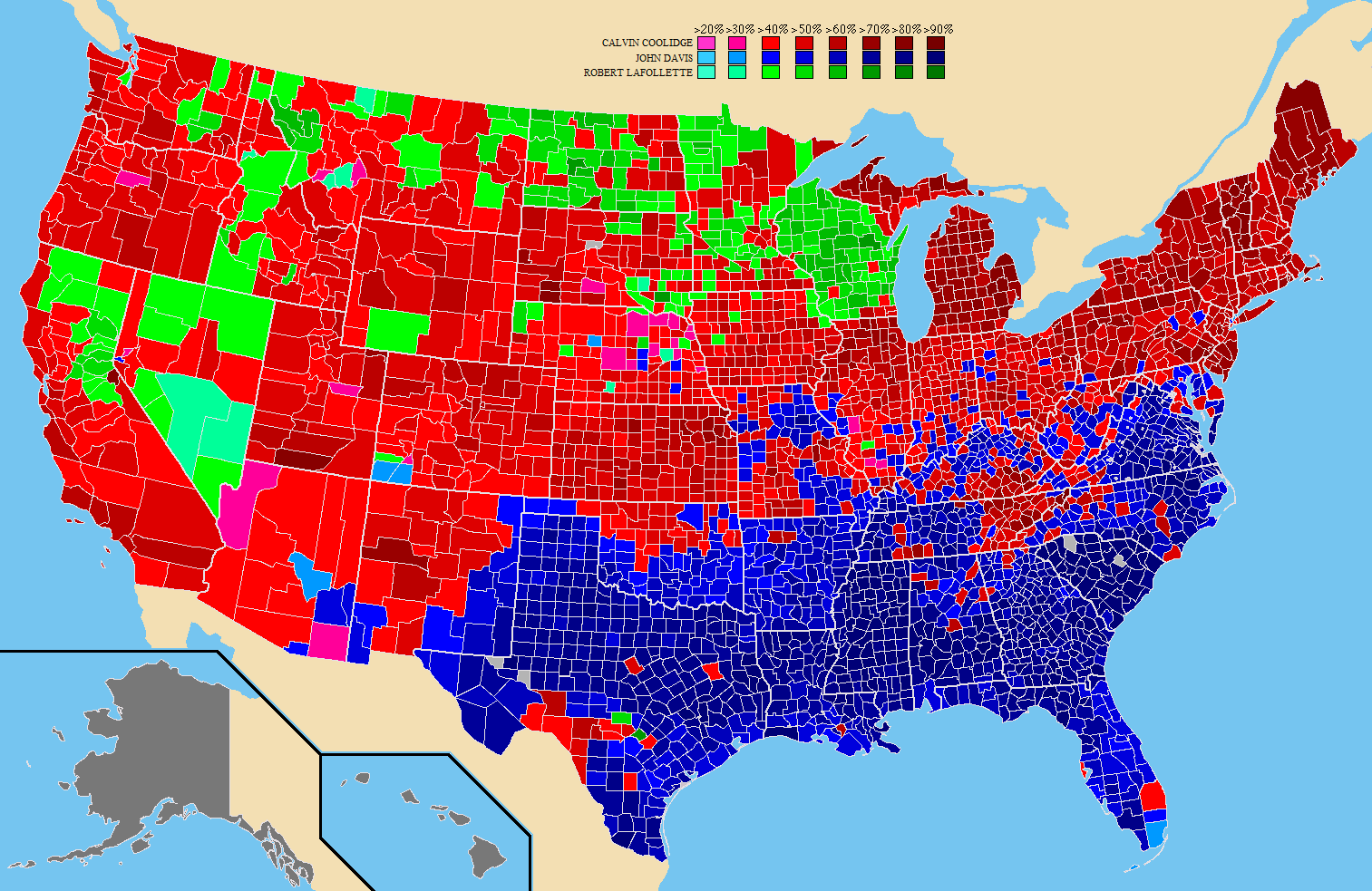
1924 Presidential election results by county. Calvin Coolidge John W. Davis Robert M. La Follette — light = plurality, green = over 50%

In 1924, Hays served as New York State chairman of the second Progressive Party.

=== Anti-McCarthyism ===
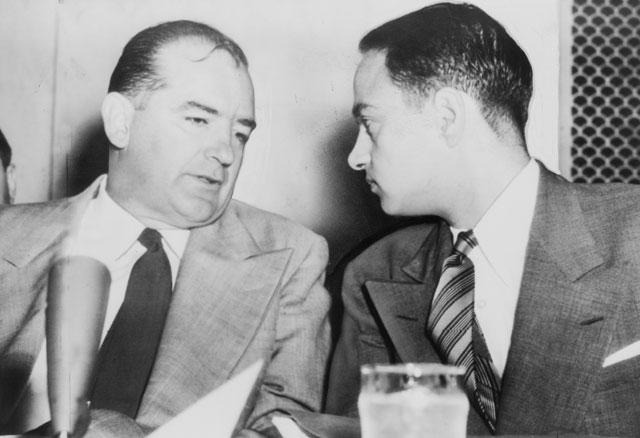
Joseph McCarthy chats with Roy Cohn (right) during Army-McCarthy hearings (19534)

In 1951, Hays appeared on Longines Chronoscope to provide comments on the political activities of US Senator Joseph McCarthy. Hays stated:

I think he is the most dangerous man in the United States. I think he Senator McCarthy is more dangerous to freedom in the United States than all the Communists we have in this country... I think he's dangerous, because without evidence, he is smearing a lot of respected and highly decent people.

His greatest criticism regarded McCarthy's methods. He defended Owen Lattimore and Philip Jessup but conceded that there were "a few" communists in the State Department and cited Alger Hiss.

== Personal life and death ==
Hays married Blanche Marks in 1908; they divorced in 1924, after having a daughter Lora, an actress and film editor.

He married Aline Davis Fleisher in 1924, and they had a daughter Jane. Aline Fleisher Hays died in 1944. Jane married the prominent American lawyer William J. Butler.

Hays died of a heart attack on December 14, 1954, at the age of 73.

== Legacy ==
In 1958, New York University established the Arthur Garfield Hays Civil Liberties Program at its School of Law.

Princeton University houses the Arthur Garfield Hays Papers.

Hays was a partner of Hays, St John & Buckley, also known as Hays, St. John, Abramson & Heilbron, of which Osmond K. Fraenkel was later a member.

== Works ==
Hays wrote numerous books, articles, and essays on civil liberties issues. As a gifted writer and debater, he added his perspective to virtually every individual rights issue of his day. His autobiography, entitled City Lawyer: The Autobiography of a Law Practice (1942), provides an account of his more noteworthy cases. His articles and book reviews demonstrate his wide-ranging knowledge of a nation and a world experiencing dramatic change in the way individual rights were perceived.

- Let Freedom Ring (1928, rev. ed. 1937)
- Trial by Prejudice (1937)
- Democracy Works (1939)
- City Lawyer: The Autobiography of a Law Practice (1942)
