= Pietro Pinna =

Pietro Pinna (5 January 1927 - 13 April 2016) was an Italian non-violence activist. He is considered the first person against military service in Italy.

== Life ==
He was born in Finale Ligure, from Sardinia. Pinna lived in Ferrara when, at the end of 1948, he was drafted. Becoming strongly anti-militarist after experiencing the horrors of the Second World War, and influenced by the thought of Aldo Capitini, he decided to refuse to serve as a military service, going down in history as the first conscientious objector of Italy for political reasons.

After a trial for disobedience (art. 173 military criminal code of peace ), he was sentenced to prison for a first time for ten months, and then for another eight. At the trial he was defended by the lawyer Bruno Segre, who will become one of the most famous Italian defenders in the field of conscientious objection.

Thanks to the echo given by Capitini to his disobedience, the case took on international significance. Pinna received a telegram of support from the First Lagy Wilson and the daughter of Leone Tolstoy, Tatiana Tolstoy Suhotin, wrote that she had "cried with joy reading what these brave young people are doing". In addition, twenty-three British parliamentarians, chaired by the Labor Reverend Reginald W. Sorensen, signed a letter addressed to Prime Minister De Gasperi to intercede on his behalf.

Pinna later became one of Capitini's closest collaborators, with whom he organized the first Perugia-Assisi March for Peace in 1961. He continued to work in the nonviolent movement throughout his life, becoming national secretary from 1968 to 1976. He was editor in chief of the magazine Nonviolent Action until his death, which occurred on April 13, 2016.

He risked jail for his nonviolent actions. On 17 January 1973, former secretary of the Nonviolent Movement, following a posting against the celebration of the Armed Forces on 4 November ("Not a party but mourning"), he was arrested in Perugia and sentenced for direct contempt of the Armed Forces. Following the demonstrations that took place in his support in various cities, he was freed four weeks later at the request of clemency by the President of the Republic Giovanni Leone.

In April 1979 he was sentenced by the Court of Appeal of Trieste to an 8-month prison sentence for a roadblock, a sentence which was later pardoned.

He was among the organizers of the Catania-Comiso March (24 December 1982 - 3 January 1983) to protest against the installation of the US missile base, the first concrete action of nonviolent struggle against military installations in Italy.

In 2008 he was awarded the National Nonviolence Award.

In 2012 the Faculty of Law of the University of Pisa awarded him an honorary degree in Peace Sciences.

Pietro Pinna died on April 13, 2016 in Florence.
