= Lola Maverick Lloyd =

American pacifist, suffragist and world federalist

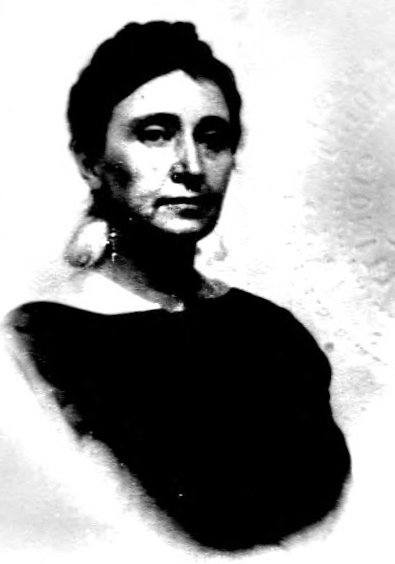
- Lloyd in 1915
- Born: November 24, 1875; Castroville, Texas, U.S.
- Died: July 25, 1944 (aged 68); Winnetka, Illinois, U.S.
- Occupation(s): Social and political activist, author
- Title: Co-founder of Campaign for World Government
- Children: Jessie Lloyd O'Connor; William Bross Lloyd Jr.; Mary Maverick Lloyd; Georgia Lloyd

Lola Maverick Lloyd (November 24, 1875 – July 25, 1944) was an American pacifist, suffragist, world federalist and feminist. Born in Texas to the wealthy Maverick family, Lola Maverick married William Bross Lloyd, the son of muckraking journalist Henry Demarest Lloyd. Together, they used their family's influence and wealth to support Progressive Era causes.

Following a public and contentious divorce, Lola Maverick Lloyd dedicated the rest of her life to supporting pacifism. She worked to establish the Woman's Peace Party and Women's International League for Peace and Freedom in 1915. Lloyd co-founded the Campaign for World Government in 1937, the first organizational attempt at a world government and world federalism, with close friend Rosika Schwimmer.

== Biography ==
=== Early life ===
Lola Maverick was born on November 24, 1875, in Castroville, Texas, to lawyer George Madison Maverick and Mary Elizabeth Vance, an Episcopalian. Lola was one of six children; her sister Rena Maverick Green would become a prominent citizen of San Antonio. She was the granddaughter of Samuel Maverick, a politician and land baron who was a signer of the Texas Declaration of Independence. He also served as mayor of San Antonio and is the origin of the term "maverick" to refer to an independent-minded person. His wife Mary Maverick was also an important early Texan. Lola Maverick was raised in St. Louis, Missouri and attended the Mary Institute. After graduation, she attended Smith College, a women's liberal arts college in Northampton, Massachusetts, graduating in 1897. She began a career in education, eventually returning to Smith College to teach mathematics in 1901.

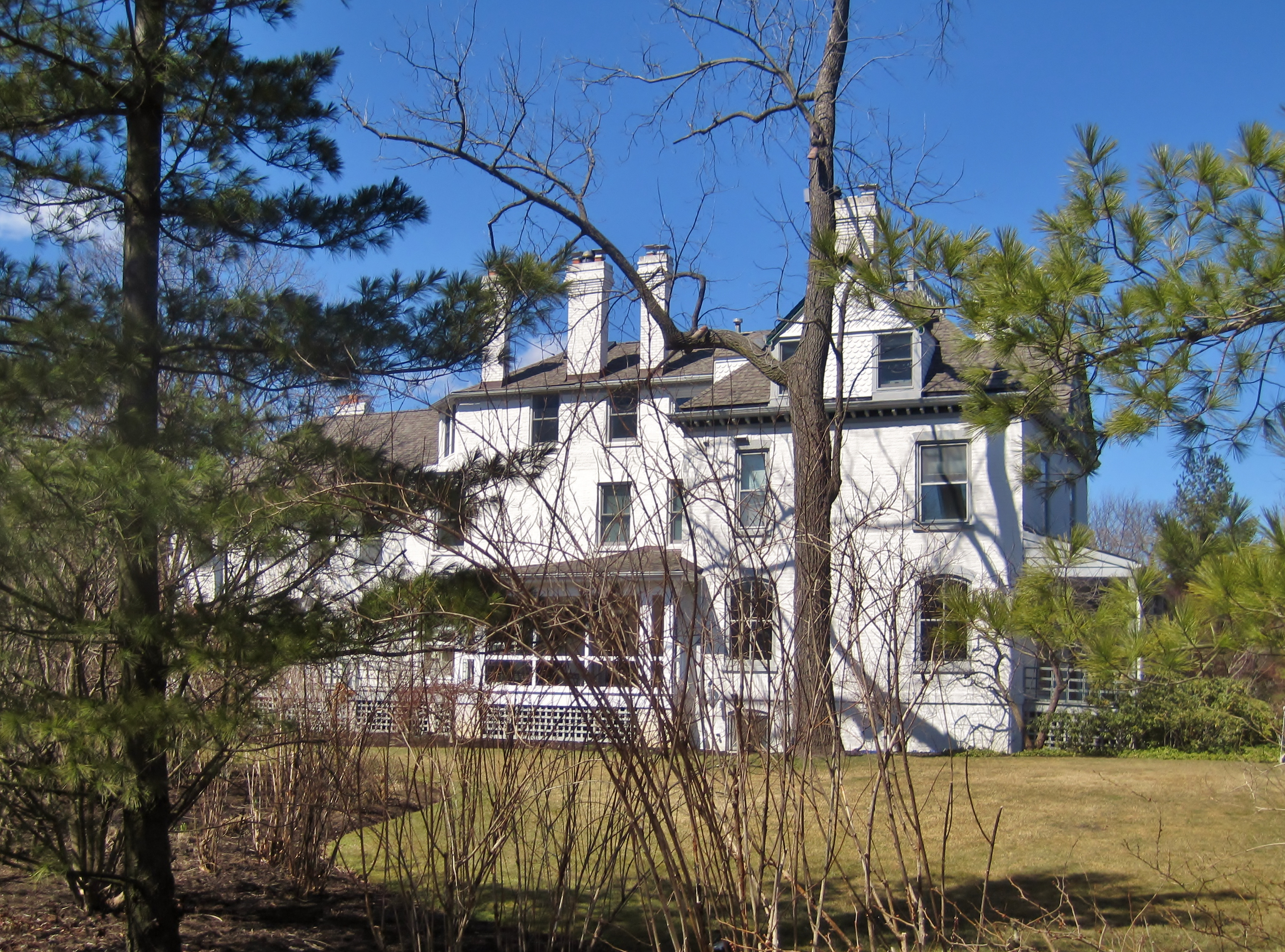
William Bross and Lola Maverick Lloyd lived at The Wayside following the death of Henry Demarest Lloyd.

During a trip to Rhode Island to visit a friend in 1898, Maverick met William Bross Lloyd, the eldest son of muckraking journalist Henry Demarest Lloyd. Lloyd was studying law at Harvard College and shared Maverick's progressive ideals. Maverick and Lloyd would meet again in Rhode Island in 1899 and 1901. They were married in San Antonio in 1902, the year Lloyd graduated. The newlyweds embarked on a cross-country camping trip from San Antonio to Winnetka, Illinois. In spring 1903, they built a small cottage they called Half Wayside across the street from Henry Demarest Lloyd's house, The Wayside. Henry Demarest and Jessie Bross Lloyd died in 1903 and 1904, respectively, and William Lloyd inherited The Wayside. Maverick and Lloyd had their first child, Jessie, in February 1904, and a second daughter, Mary, in June 1906. Their first son Bill was born in September 1908. She is also mother to Georgia Lloyd, whom co-founded the Campaign for World Government and participated in the formation of the United Nations amongst other pacificist and advocacy roles.

William practiced some law in Chicago and was nominally a director of the Chicago Tribune, but worked infrequently, spending most of his time at home with Lola. They built a small vacation home on the Maverick family property in Bexar County, Texas.

=== Pacifist causes ===
Following the outbreak of World War I, Lola attended a lecture by Hungarian pacifist Rosika Schwimmer. Schwimmer was touring the country in an effort to increase American interests in finding a peaceful solution to the war. Lloyd followed Schwimmer to over a dozen more events. Lloyd was one of the delegates that founded the Woman's Peace Party in Washington, D.C., in January 1915. Lola then traveled to Europe with forty-seven other women that April for the International Congress of Women at The Hague. After the congress, she returned to Chicago to help organize Henry Ford's Peace Ship, an unsuccessful effort to force a peace conference to mediate an end to the war. She was a member of the "Committee of Seven" overseeing the resulting Neutral Conference for Continuous Mediation.

=== Private life ===
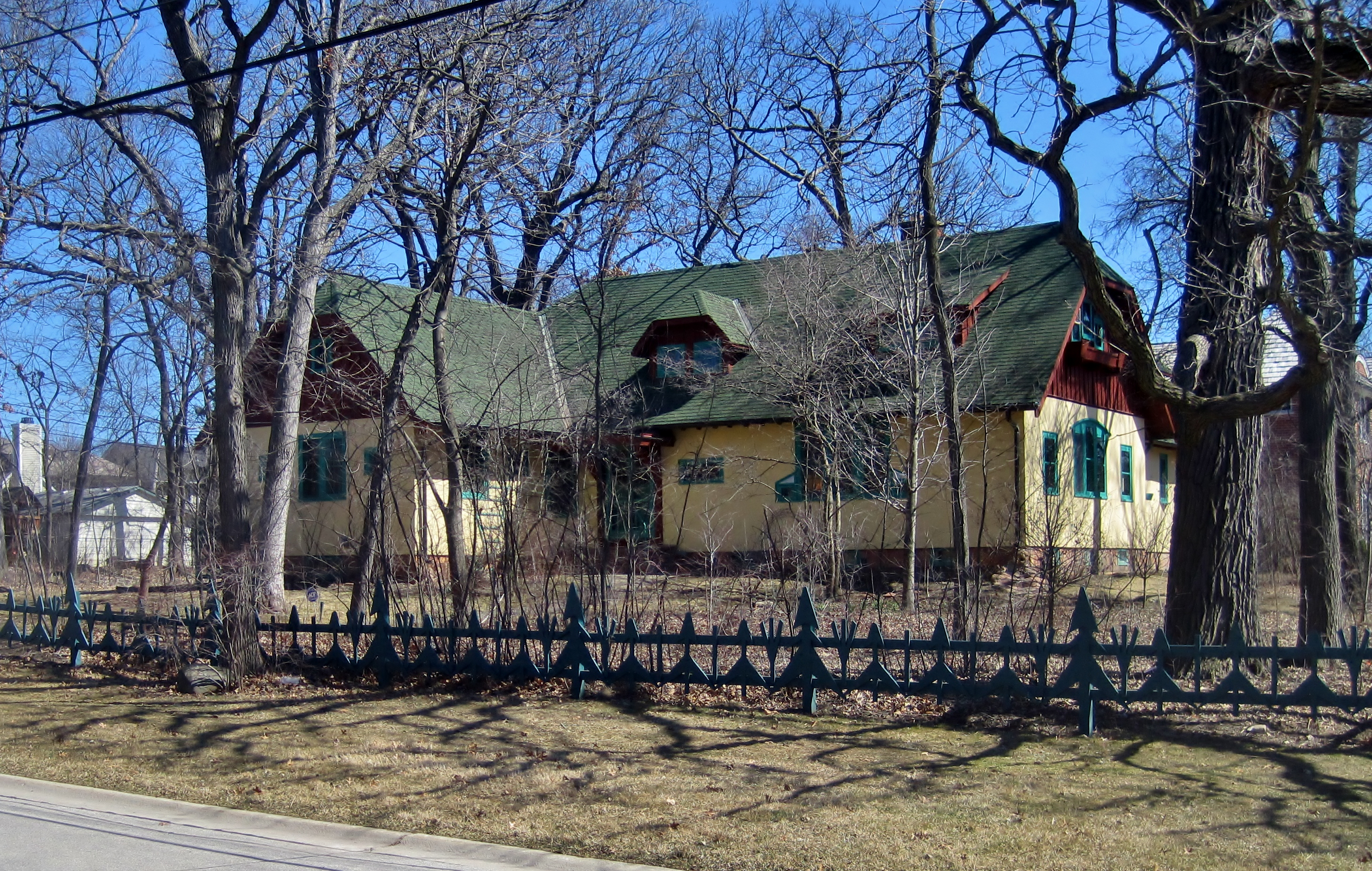
Lola Maverick Lloyd owned this house in Winnetka from its construction in 1920 until her death, although she spent much time abroad.

Starting in 1913, the Maverick and Lloyd marriage began to crumble. Lola struggled with complications from the birth of her fourth child, Georgia. She also lost her father that year, with whom she was very close. Lola's pacifist interests, especially her international trip to The Hague, contributed to the deterioration of the marriage. William and Lola continued to fight, until 1916, when William Lloyd left the family to spend a month in California under suspicious circumstances. Lola filed for divorce, still a rarity at the time, on the grounds of adultery. Because of the wealth and social prominence of the two families, the proceedings became a public spectacle. Lola was awarded primary custody of her four children. Lloyd wanted to bring the children with her to Texas, but the court ordered that she must remain in the Chicago area so that William could maintain visitation rights. In March 1920, she bought three lots in downtown Winnetka and had the Lola Maverick Lloyd House built. In her precious spare time, Lloyd practiced painting, drawing, and sculpture, and these elements were reflected in the Arts & Crafts design of her house.

=== Postwar activities ===
Lloyd continued to pursue her ideals after the conclusion of World War I. In 1918, she began renting an office in downtown Chicago so that her ideological friends could have a place to work and stay. Lola joined the National Woman's Party to push for women's suffrage. Lloyd was a member of the Socialist Party of Illinois and became a member of the Women's Committee for the Recognition of Soviet Russia in 1920. She regularly published pamphlets and commentaries on behalf of the Woman's Peace Party, then known as the Women's International League for Peace and Freedom (WILPF). In 1926, with three of her four children graduated and out of the house, Lloyd moved to Geneva, Switzerland to work more closely with the WILPF. She was elected to the board of WILPF in 1933. In 1937, she co-founded the Campaign for World Government with Mary, Bill, Georgia, and Rosika Schwimmer. The organization was the first organisation to call for world federalism and a world government in the wake of the floundering League of Nations. It sought a democratic government by the people, instead of one led by the world leaders that Lloyd determined to be war-makers. Later in the 20th century, the federalist movement have led the coalition for the creation of the International Criminal Court, which Lloyd rarely gets credit for.

=== Death ===
By 1939, Lloyd's health was failing. She suffered from migraine headaches which would keep her in bed for days at a time. She moved back to her Winnetka house full-time with her daughter Mary. Lola Maverick Lloyd died of complications from pancreatic cancer on July 25, 1944, at the age of 68. Jessie Lloyd spoke the eulogy at her memorial service and believed that the outbreak of World War II undermined her health.

== See also ==
- List of peace activists
