= Aldo Capitini =

Italian philosopher, poet, activist, and educator (1899–1968)

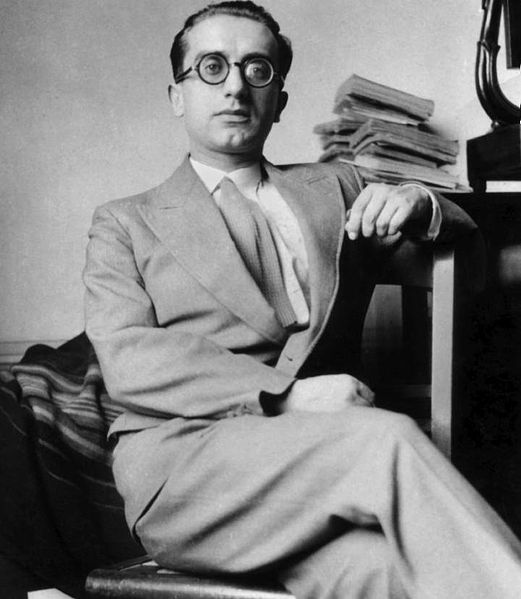
- Born: 23 December 1899; Perugia, Kingdom of Italy
- Died: 19 October 1968 (aged 68); Perugia, Italy

Philosophical work
- Era: 20th century
- Region: Western philosophy
- School: Nonviolence; Social Catholicism; Liberal socialism / Social liberalism Secularism

Aldo Capitini (23 December 1899 – 19 October 1968) was an Italian philosopher, poet, political activist, anti-fascist, and educator. He was one of the first Italians to take up and develop Mahatma Gandhi's theories of nonviolence and was known as "the Italian Gandhi".

== Life ==
=== Early life, 1899–1920 ===
Capitini was born in Perugia in 1899. His father was a municipal official and his mother a tailor. From an early age, Capitini was interested in philosophy and literature. Up to the age of 17, he followed Futurism and the nationalists who supported the intervention of Italy in World War I. From 1918 to 1919 he moved to support humanitarian, pacifist and socialist causes. He was committed to the study of Latin and Greek literature.

Capitini was physically fragile and an invalid. Prolonged illness in his youth led to religious conversion and the radical change of his political views. Of this period he said, "During the World War I was a teenager, but I followed the tragedy of humanity. ... Moreover, I suffered a long painful illness and was unable to work. Thus, I understood the limitations of my activist culture in the fibres of my being, which gave paramount value to action, to violence, and to enjoyment, and I felt a deep interest in, and solidarity with, the problems of those who suffer, those who cannot act, and those who are overwhelmed. I would need to envisage a reality where suffering people were perfectly well, and not thrown on the edge of civilization, waiting for death and nothingness. This is how my religious search really started".

In 1919 he acquired a Technical Institute diploma. Then, in 1924, he enrolled in the Scuola Normale Superiore di Pisa, completing his master's degree in philosophy in 1928.

=== Under Fascism, 1922–1945 ===
In the late 1920s, Capitini became a follower of Gandhi's nonviolence and a vegetarian. His views on religion reversed when the Catholic Church signed the Lateran Treaty with the Fascist dictatorship in 1929. As a result, Capitini committed to his anti-fascist activities. From then on, he proposed that religions should go beyond their dogmatism and their authoritarian structure to be at the service of marginalized people and those who had no voice in society.

In 1930, he began working as a secretary at the Scuola Normale Superiore di Pisa. He became close to anti-fascist students, as a professor being a conscientious objector. In 1933, the director of the Scuola Normale Superiore di Pisa, a Fascist intellectual Giovanni Gentile, asked Capitini to join the Fascist Party. Capitini refused and was dismissed. He then applied himself to nonviolent non-cooperation. In order to survive, he returned to his family in Perugia, where he undertook private lessons until the end of World War II in 1945. Capitini propagated anti-fascism from 1933 to 1943, meeting with groups of young people, especially in central Italy. He published three books on philosophy and religion, which passed the Fascist censorship, with support from the liberal philosopher Benedetto Croce. He was imprisoned twice for five months for his anti-fascist activities in 1942/3.

In July 1944, with Emma Thomas, an English Quaker, Capitini founded the Centro di Orientamento Sociale (Centre for Social Orientation) in Perugia. It was successful and spread to other cities, including Ferrara, Florence, Bologna, Lucca, Arezzo, Ancona, Assisi and Naples. It failed to establish itself permanently because of the indifference of the Left and the hostility of the Christian Democratic Party.

=== Post-war, 1946–1968 ===
Capitini stood aside from the Cold War and the new Italian Republic, but promoted causes and became the most important exponent of nonviolence in Italy. In 1946, he arranged a meeting on religious problems, hoping to find a synthesis between social and religious life. After further meetings in 1947, the Religious Movement was established, to promote religious freedom in Italy. In 1948, it held its first Italian congress for religious reform, in Rome. In 1950, Capitini organized the first Italian conference in Rome on the subject of conscientious objection.

Capitini attended the World Congress of Religions for Peace Foundation, held in London in 1950. He proposed the establishment of a Nonviolent Religious International Movement. He protested against the appeal made by the meeting to religious leaders, saying that leaders are responsible for the compromise of states and wars and that the Congress had to address directly appeal to people individually. He participated in the Congress of Vedanta in London in 1951, with the theme "Peace, unity of the world, the spiritual community".

In January 1952, Capitini promoted an International Conference for Nonviolence in Perugia. At the end of the meeting, he created an International Coordinating Center for Nonviolence. In the same year he held another conference in Perugia to study nonviolence with respect for plant and animal life. The outcome of the conference was the creation of the Italian Vegetarian Society, with Capitini as president and based in Perugia. The society became a collective effort after 20 years based on Capitini's personal control; it continues as the Italian Vegetarian Association.

In 1953, Capitini also held the first West-East Asia Conference in Perugia. The aim of the meeting was to highlight the similarities between Asia and Western countries, especially from the nonviolence perspective. In 1954, Capitini held a seminar of lectures and discussions on the methodology of Gandhi in Perugia.

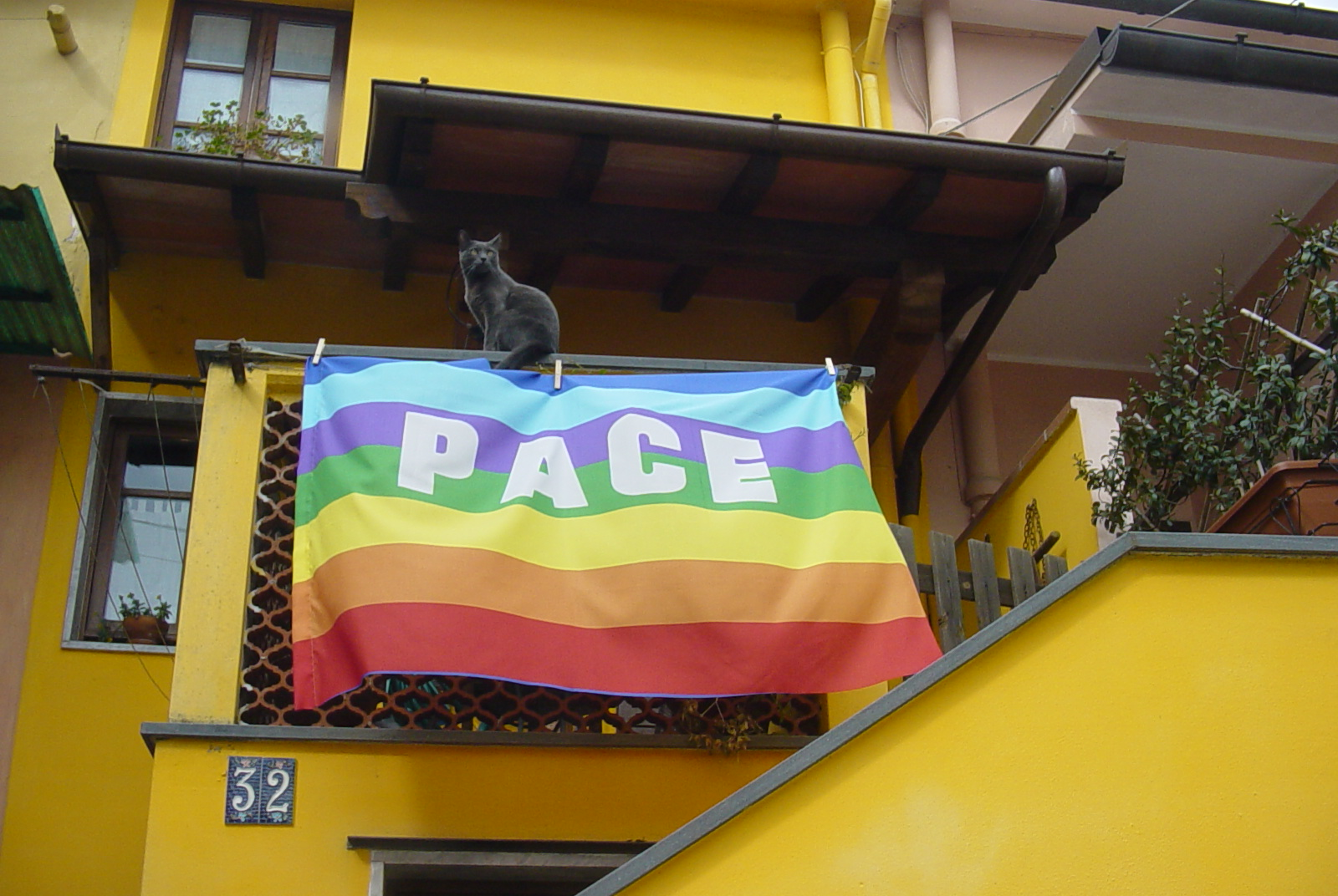
The peace flag flown from a balcony in Italy

Capitini became a professor of pedagogy at the University of Cagliari in 1956, and in 1965 was granted a transfer to the University of Perugia with the same chair.

In 1961, with the help of political forces of the Left, Capitini promoted a 24 km March for Peace and the Brotherhood of Peoples from Perugia to Assisi in 1961, in the context of international tension. Its purpose was to assert that "peace is prepared in time of peace". The March was repeated many times, most recently in 2011. From the 1961 March the Italian Advisory Council for Peace was set up, with Capitini was appointed as president; also the Nonviolent Movement for Peace, with as Secretary Capitini. Capitini organized the National Conference on Disarmament Affairs in Florence in 1962, and held a seminar on techniques of nonviolence in Perugia in 1963, with the participation of leaders of the Committee of 100.

Inspired by the peace flags used on British peace marches, Capitini had some women of Perugia hurriedly sew together coloured strips of material for the 1961 peace march. The use of the flag became widespread with the Pace da tutti i balconi ("Peace from every balcony") campaign in 2002, a protest against the impending war in Iraq and is now used by peace organizations throughout the world. In 2003, the Italian newspaper Corriere della Sera reported the opinion of leading advertising executives that it had become more popular than the Italian national flag. The original flag was kept by Capitini's collaborator, Lanfranco Mencaroni, at Collevalenza, near Todi. In 2011, plans were announced to transfer it to the Palazzo dei Priori in Perugia.

At the 12th Congress of War Resisters' International in Rome in 1966, Capitini gave a paper on International nonviolence and permanent revolution. Two meetings in Perugia were the first congresses of the Nonviolent Movement for Peace. Capitini introduced a report, on the violent revolutionary methods, arguing that nonviolent revolution is much more effective.

Capitini promoted A.D.E.S.S.P.I. (Associazione per la difesa e lo sviluppo della scuola pubblica italiana [Association for the protection and development of the Italian public school]). This association was launched to defend and promote the rights of everyone to an education. In particular, the Association defended freedom of instruction by attempting to make formal education similar to the confessional. To achieve this, the Association was the guarantor and controller of legislative and administrative power.

Among those Capitini engaged with his causes were Danilo Dolci, a social activist, sociologist, popular educator and poet, known for his opposition against poverty, social exclusion and the Mafia in Sicily; and Lorenzo Milani, a priest and educator known for his civic education of the poor, and for his fight against injustice and violence.

Capitini died on 19 October 1968 following the after-effects of surgery.

== Views ==
Capitini was influenced by meeting Claudio Baglietto, a philosopher and conscientious objector who died in exile in Switzerland. His own background had components that Massimiliano Fortuna defined in an essay: integral parts of the Kantian criticism (for the primacy of the moral law), idealism (Hegel, Benedetto Croce, Giovanni Gentile), Marxian analysis and Gandhian spirituality. To these elements, Norberto Bobbio (1984) added the influence of Giacomo Leopardi (poet and writer) and Giuseppe Mazzini (politician and philosopher). Capitini, as he wrote in his Letters of Religion, published posthumously in the book The Power of All, to form his own ideas went back "to the teachers of religious life", enumerated as Jesus Christ, Buddha, St. Francis of Assisi, Gandhi and Mazzini. At the end of World War II, he wrote the Manifesto of the Liberal Socialism with Guido Calogero, in order to combine liberalism with socialism. In Capitani's view, liberal socialism (liberalsocialismo) should be a pressure group concentrating on lobbying.

Capitini took from the philosopher Carlo Michelstaedter of Gorizia the importance of persuasion, as the ability to pursue one's own ideals with tenacity, and the power of nonviolence, a gentle power, however determined. In 1948, Pietro Pinna listened to Capitini at a conference sponsored by the Movement of Religion in Ferrara. Pinna underwent a trial and a first conviction in 1949. Capitini mobilized to help Pinna and called on the support of intellectual friends and Members of the Italian Parliament.

Antonio Vigilante states that there are many similarities between Capitini's religiosity and Buddhism.

== Writings ==
- 1937 Elementi di un'esperienza religiosa, (Elements of a Religious Experience, Outlined his religious philosophy and presented the theoretical foundations of the principles of nonviolence.), Laterza, Bari.
- 1942 Vita religiosa, Cappelli, Bologna.
- 1943 Atti della presenza aperta, Sansoni, Firenze.
- 1947 Saggio sul soggetto della storia, La Nuova Italia, Firenze.
- 1948 Esistenza e presenza del soggetto in Atti del Congresso internazionale di Filosofia (II Vol.), Castellani, Milano.
- 1948 La realtà di tutti, Arti Grafiche Tornar, Pisa.
- 1948 Religious Problems Today
- 1949 Italia nonviolenta, (Nonviolent Italy), Libreria Internazionale di Avanguardia, Bologna.
- 1950 Nuova socialità e riforma religiosa, (New Social Relations and Religious Reform), Einaudi, Torino.
- 1951 L'atto di educare, La Nuova Italia, Firenze.
- 1955 Religione aperta, (Open Religion), Guanda, Modena.
- 1956 Colloquio corale, Pacini Mariotti, Pisa.
- 1956 Open Revolution
- 1957 I Argue the Religion of Pius XXII
- 1958 Aggiunta religiosa all'opposizione, Parenti, Firenze.
- 1958 Danilo Dolci on nonviolence
- 1958 The experience of Danilo Dolci
- 1959 Conscientious Objection in Italy
- 1961 Battezzati non credenti, (Non-Believing Baptized), Parenti, Firenze.
- 1962 On the Road to Peace
- 1962 Nonviolence Today
- 1964 Founded the magazine Nonviolent Action, which became the official organ of the Nonviolent Movement.
- 1964 Civic Education in School and Social Life
- 1965 Religious Life
- 1967 Le tecniche della nonviolenza, (The Techniques of Nonviolence), Feltrinelli, Milano (rist. Linea D'Ombra, Milano 1989).
- 1967–1968 Educazione aperta (2 Vols.), (Open Education), La Nuova Italia, Firenze.
- n.d. Letters of Religion An anthology of sixty-three letters written from 1951 to 1968.
- 1969 Il potere di tutti, introduzione di N. Bobbio, prefazione di P. Pinna, La Nuova Italia, Firenze.
- 1992 Scritti sulla nonviolenza, a cura di L. Schippa, Protagon, Perugia
- 1994 Scritti filosofici e religiosi, a cura di M. Martini, Protagon, Perugia
- 2004 Le ragioni della nonviolenza. Antologia degli scritti, a cura di M. Martini, Ets, Pisa
- 2007 Lettere 1931–1968, "Epistolario di Aldo Capitini, 1" – con Walter Binni, a cura di L. Binni e L. Giuliani, Carocci, Roma
- 2008 Lettere 1952–1968, "Epistolario di Aldo Capitini, 2" – con Danilo Dolci, a cura di G. Barone e S. Mazzi, Carocci, Roma
- 2009 Lettere 1936–1968, "Epistolario di Aldo Capitini, 3" – con Guido Calogero, a cura di Th. Casadei e G. Moscati, Carocci, Roma
- He also founded a monthly magazine of national circulation, entitled The Power of All based on citizen participation in power and the means and methods available to citizens for the control of institutions from below.
