= Aline Davis Hays =

American clothing designer, textile manufacturer, and arts promoter (1887–1944)

- Aline Davis Hays, from a 1933 newspaper.
- Born: Aline Julia Davis; April 12, 1887; New York, US
- Died: June 3, 1944 (aged 57); New York, US
- Other name: Aline Davis Fleisher
- Occupations: Textile designer, organizer, pacifist, arts administrator
- Organization: League of Women Shoppers
- Known for: Consumer protection advocacy
- Movement: Women's poll tax repeal movement
- Spouse: Arthur Garfield Hays (m. 1924)
- Children: 3

Aline Davis Hays (April 12, 1887 – June 3, 1944), born Aline Julia Davis, was an American clothing designer, textile manufacturer, and arts promoter, president of the League of Women Shoppers, a pro-labor consumers' rights organization.

== Early life ==
Aline Davis was born in New York, the daughter of Charles L. Davis and Julia Minzheimer Davis. Her parents were Jewish. She attended art school as a young woman, but left to marry her first husband.

== Career ==
Aline Fleisher was a clothing designer who made theatrical costumes in New York in the 1910s. She also wrote a suffrage pageant with Hazel MacKaye, which was performed at Carnegie Hall in March 1919. In 1922, she was one of the three organizers of the People's Art Assembly, an experimental art show in New York City intended to make art accessible to working people, with free admission and longer hours. She became a department store stylist in the late 1920s, and finding the available fabrics lacking, she began designing fashionable cotton prints for Ameritex-Sudanette. In 1933, she explained her belief that "Every woman who has any creative talent should foster and develop it, no matter what difficulty or opposition she may encounter."

In 1938, Hays was elected first president of the League of Women Shoppers, a consumer rights' organization she co-founded in 1935. She was arrested in 1936, for picketing a department store accused of unfair labor practices. Her name was mentioned in testimony before the House Special Committee on Un-American Activities in 1938, when political activist J. B. Matthews commented "Aline Davis Hays has supported a good many Communist-front organizations" based on her leadership of the League of Women Shoppers, her activities in peace and labor causes and the women's poll tax repeal movement, and her support for friends with Communist affiliation. She submitted an affidavit to the committee, disputing Matthews' comments.

In 1941, she was co-founder of the Citizens' Committee for Government Arts Projects. She was also honorary chair of the American Peace Mobilization's New York council.

== Personal life ==
Aline Davis married Walter S. Fleisher in 1910. They had two children. She married civil rights lawyer Arthur Garfield Hays in 1924, as his second wife. They had a daughter, Jane. Jane married prominent American lawyer William J. Butler. She died in 1944, aged 57 years, in New York.
