= League of Women Shoppers =

US consumer advocacy group

- Abbreviation: LWS
- Formation: 1935
- Dissolved: 1949

The League of Women Shoppers (LWS) was an American consumer advocacy group that also participated in collective actions that worked towards social justice for workers. They also fought against racial discrimination of all kinds. LWS was founded in 1935 in New York City and Aline Davis Hays served as the first president. Chapters of LWS were formed in cities around the country. Members of LWS were involved in different actions. Some were involved in educating consumers on labor issues. Others watched legislation and put out alerts for members to contact their representatives about the issues. LWS members, most of whom were middle class or upper class women, participated in strikes and pickets and served as allies to working class women and African-American workers. Because of their collective action techniques and also because of animosity from members of another consumer group, Consumers' Research (CR), LWS was accused of Un-American activities in the early 1940s. They were blacklisted and members began to leave, causing the group to dissolve in 1949.

== About ==
The League of Women Shoppers (LWS) was focused on using collective consumer power to reform the conditions of workers. LWS created "buyers' strikes" which often led to boycotts and also raised awareness of various social issues. They also supported African-American buyers' campaigns, such as "Don't buy where you can't work." LWS saw consumable materials as social artifacts which could be judged on how they were produced and brought to the consumer. LWS promoted the idea that women could look into how goods were made, who produced them, and how these people were treated. A group of consumers, mostly women, could help bring more justice through thoughtful choices in shopping.

LWS was strongly pro-labor and was described by the president of the LWS Chicago chapter, Jessie Lloyd O'Connor, as bringing consumers "into understanding and sympathetic action with labor." LWS felt that working conditions were connected to an adverse outcome in the lives of workers, especially for women workers. LWS also felt that consumers' choices were responsible for the conditions of workers. To further their goals, LWS would also work with other groups such as the Consumers' League, the Women's Trade Union League (WTUL), other trade unions, Parent Teacher Associations (PTA), and church groups.

The group emphasized the need for educating consumers on labor conditions and why it was important to support workers' rights. They created pamphlets and newsletters to inform consumers. Consider the Laundry Worker (1937) was created to inform consumers about the working conditions of those who clean clothes for others. LWS informed members about legislative issues and called on members to mobilize and contact their representatives. They also provided other types of education that was beneficial to members who had not attended college. Speeches on various topics were parts of LWS meetings.

Most members of the LWS were white women in the middle or upper classes. Working in LWS gave many of these women the feeling that they were doing something important. Generally, the group were also white allies to African American consumer campaigns. They supported an end to racial discrimination and worked to end the poll tax. LWS was able to use their social and material privilege in life to support working class women.

== History ==
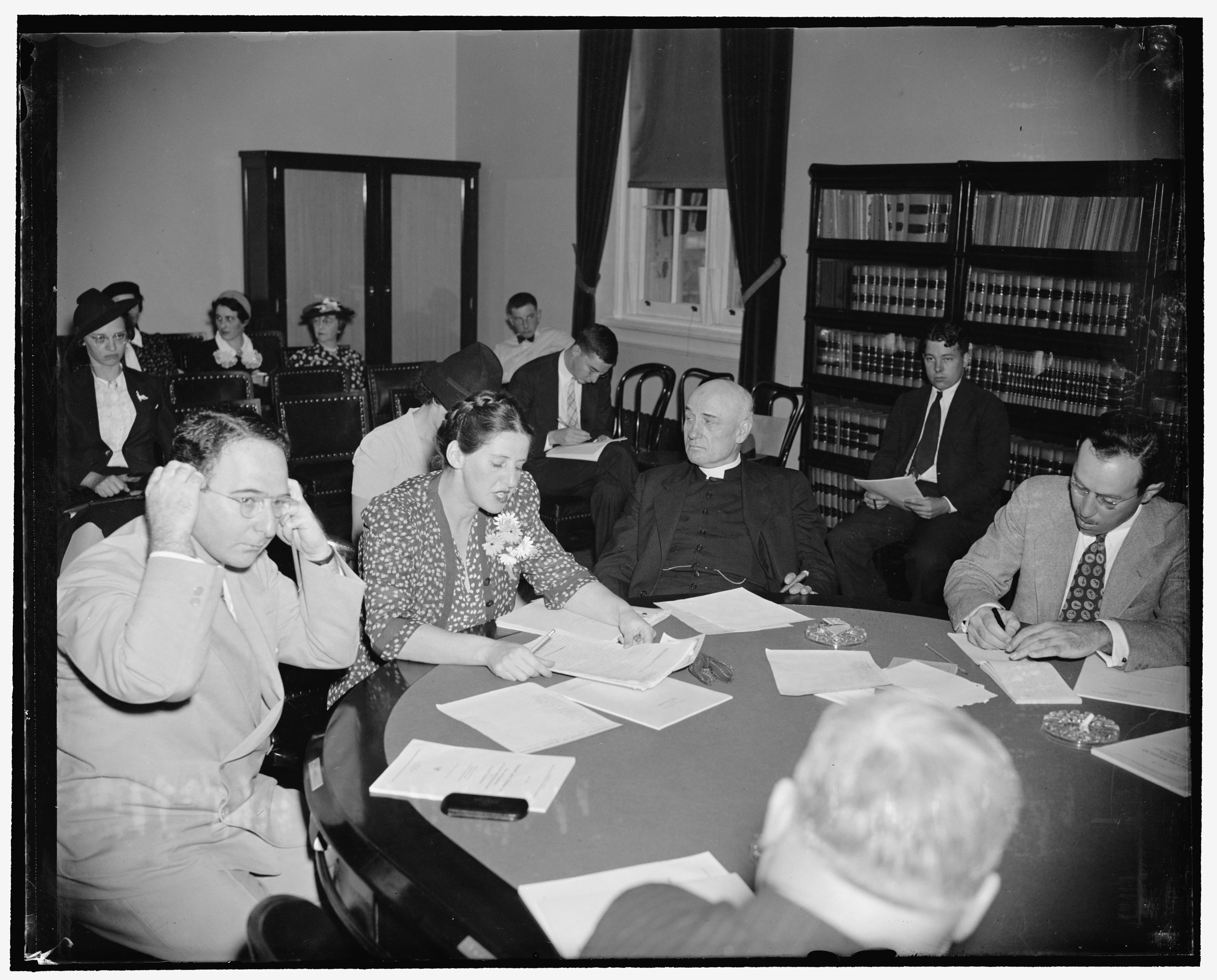
Nina P. Collier, center, Chair of the National League of Women Shoppers Legislative Committee testifies in Washington, D.C.

The League of Women Shoppers (LWS) was founded in 1935 in New York City. Aline Davis Hays hosted the first meeting in her apartment and later became the first president. By the end of the 1930s, LWS had more than twenty-five thousand participants in 14 cities.

LWS boycotted Woolworths Five-and-Dime stores in 1936 since they sold products made in factories that were involved in labor strikes. The group also produced a pamphlet that described the undesirable working conditions at the stores. LWS participated in the National Pants Company strike in 1937. They supported the workers' demands of improved wages and working conditions. In 1938, LWS joined a strike where "fur workers" were picketing Russek's Department Store in New York City. Also in 1938, LWS promoted a silk boycott campaign in order to boycott Japanese-produced silk. Around 600 "society women" in Washington, D.C. attended a fashion show sponsored by LWS called "Life Without Silk: From Morning to Midnight in Cotton and Rayon." Models showcased fashionable looks without using silk. Silk was being boycotted because of the war between Japan and China, started in July 1937. Public sentiment was on the side of China and boycotting Japan was an act of social justice against "Japanese Aggression." LWS supported waitresses striking at the George Mason Hotel in Alexandria, Virginia in 1939. At another strike to support mechanics, members of LWS showed up at the picket line in roller skates. They used the skates to generate interest and publicity for the strikers. Another campaign LWS was involved with was to change the unfair tax rules that governed margarine sales. They also participated in the 1947 "Don't Buy Meat" week.

Conservatives who opposed the 1935 National Labor Relations Act accused LWS of conspiring with the National Labor Relations Board (NLRB) and later turned to accusing LWS of being a Communist front. J.B. Matthews accused LWS of being a Communist organization in 1939. Matthews' accusation was also borne out of personal resentment against LWS, which had supported a strike at the Consumers' Research (CR) group that Matthews led. Representative Martin Dies worked with Matthews to charge LWS as an "Un-American" organization under the auspices of the House Un-American Activities Committee (HUAC). Mary Catherine Phillips, who was also associated with CR, accused LWS of being "stooges" of the Communist Party in 1940. These accusations happened in spite of the fact that LWS was always specific about wanting to create a "more inclusive democracy."

During World War II, LWS was involved in various war efforts. The group helped women negotiate ways to help the war effort through rationing and price control. They supported price control and encouraged members to get involved in the Office of Price Administration (OPA) panels and boards. When the OPA was facing political opposition, LWS members worked to support the organization.

However, after the war, conflict between the New York LWS and the Washington group increased. As the Red Scare worsened, additional members quit the LWS. In 1948, LWS appeared on the blacklist compiled by the Attorney General of "disloyal" organizations. LWS no longer worked as an independent group by 1949 and merged with the Congress of American Women. In 1950, the Congress of American Women dissolved.

== Selected publications ==
- Filley, Jane; Mitchell, Therese (1937). Consider the Laundry Workers. New York: League of Woman Shoppers. OCLC 6255001.
- The League of Women Shoppers Handbook. New York: League of Woman Shoppers. 1940. OCLC 54009736.
- Women Do Ninety Percent of the Buying: Use Your Buying Power for Justice. New York: League of Woman Shoppers. 1940. OCLC 81619393.

== Notable members ==
- Margaret Bourke-White.
- Elizabeth Wheeler Coleman.
- Nina Perera Collier.
- Lucille Ezekiel.
- Aline Davis Hays.
- Lillian Hellman.
- Jessie Lloyd O'Connor.
- Dorothy Parker.
- Cornelia Bryce Pinchot.
- Gale Sondergaard.
- Mary Heaton Vorse.
- Amber Arthun Warburton.
