= Campaign for World Government =

The Campaign for World Government
- Campaign for World Government
- Abbreviation: CWG
- Founded: 1937
- Founder: Lola Maverick Lloyd; Rosika Schwimmer
- Type: Non-profit; NGO
- Purpose: humanitarian, activism, peacekeeping, world government
- Location: United States
- Fields: World Federalism, Peace
- Key people: Lola Maverick Lloyd; Rosika Schwimmer; Georgia Lloyd

The Campaign for World Government was established in 1937 by prominent feminists and peace activists Rosika Schwimmer and Lola Maverick Lloyd. CWG emerged as the pioneering organization advocating for the establishment of a democratic federal world government. From 1943 to 1990, Georgia Lloyd, daughter of Lola Maverick Lloyd, led the Campaign after Lola's passing.

== History ==
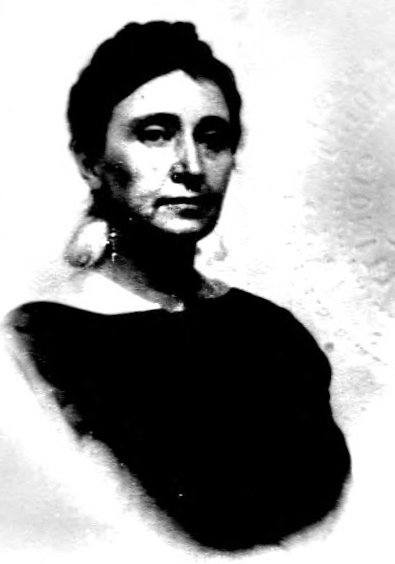
Lola Maverick Lloyd, co-founder of CWG

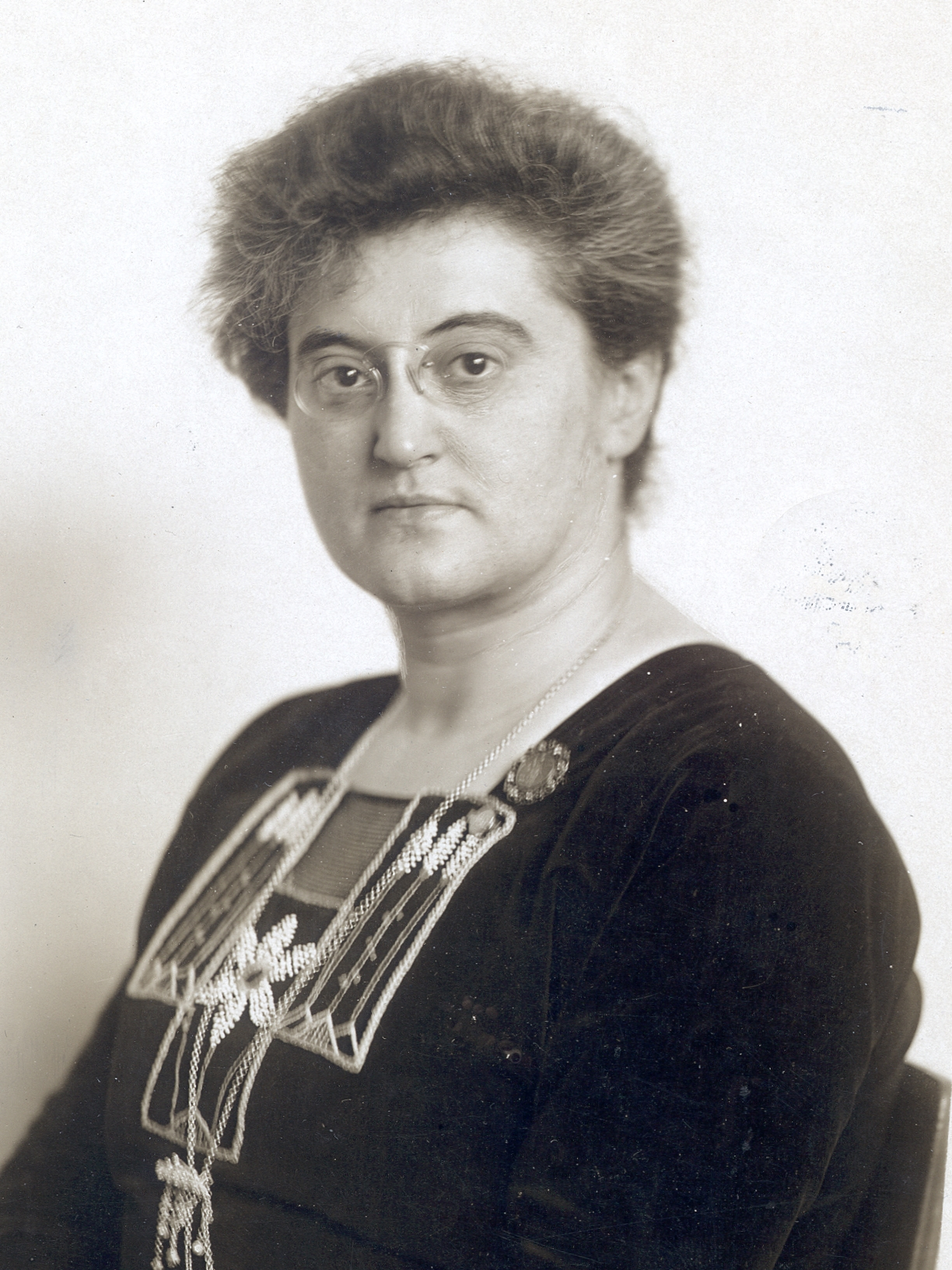
Rosika Schwimmer, co-founder of CWG

The Campaign utilized various strategies, including providing congressional testimony, lobbying lawmakers, conducting national letter-writing campaigns, and active participation in international conferences on world government. These efforts were instrumental in advancing the organization's agenda. Notable achievements included the introduction of a resolution by Hamilton Fish during the 1938 New York State Constitutional Convention, which urged President Roosevelt to convene a world constitutional convention, additionally, the introduction of several resolutions and bills in Congress, such as the "Alexander Peace Bill" (H.J.R. 610, 76th Cong. (1940)) and the "Tenerowicz Peace Bill" (H.J.R. 131, 77th Cong. (1941)).

== Split and Birth of the International Campaign for World Government ==
The Campaign operated from two distinct locations, with its international headquarters situated in New York City and its national office based in Chicago.

After the passing of Lola Maverick Lloyd in 1944 and William Lloyd's departure for a civilian public service camp, disagreements over authority and mission arose, resulting in a rift between the Lloyd children and Rosika Schwimmer. These disagreements led to the formation of a separate organization in 1945. Edith Wynner, secretary to Rosika Schwimmer, assumed leadership of the International Campaign for World Government (ICWG) based in New York, while Georgia Lloyd, daughter of Lola Maverick Lloyd, continued to lead the Campaign in Chicago until her death in 1999, retaining its previous title.

== Later years ==
Mary Georgia Lloyd was later joined by other American federalists and peace activist like Henry Philip Isely, Margaret Sheesley (later Margaret Isely) and Thane Read which lead to the call for a World Constitutional Convention for World Government and this group later developed into the World Constitution and Parliament Association (WCPA).

== World Federation Now ==
CWG published a newsletter 'World Federation Now'. Georgia Lloyd succeeded her brother as editor of it.

== See also ==
- World Government
- World Federalisam
- World Constitution and Parliament Association (WCPA)
