= Emma Thomas (Quaker) =

English educator (1872–1960)

Emma Thomas (1872–1960) was an English schoolteacher and member of the Society of Friends. She taught in London County Council schools. She is best known for her later role in founding the International Fellowship School in Switzerland (1923–1936) for the Fellowship of Reconciliation, and her work in Perugia from the 1940s with Aldo Capitini.

== Early life ==
She was the daughter of a master shoemaker, born 8 September 1872 in Lewisham, and trained as a schoolteacher at Stockwell College of Education. In 1905 she applied to study at the London School of Economics, graduating in 1909. She took an interest in the garden cities movement. In 1919 she was on the New Town Council.

== International Fellowship School ==
In October 1921, Emma Thomas founded a school in Gland, Switzerland with the support of the Fellowship of Reconciliation in the United Kingdom. She had separate financial backing of £4,000 raised by Thomas William McCormack. McCormack (died 1932) was a Somerset House official and Fabian Society member who retired early, for health reasons, and went into local politics, becoming Mayor of St Pancras in 1921.

Pierre Cérésole and Marguerite Gobat taught at the school. Also on the staff was the education writer M. L. V. Hughes (Mabel Lawson Violet Hughes 1879–1955), a graduate of Somerville College, Oxford and author of Citizens to Be (1915) and a Fellowship of Reconciliation pamphlet "Patriotism and Internationalism in Schools". She has been taken as an advocate of educational humanism.

In 1925 George D. Herron wrote to Jane Addams a letter of introduction to Thomas, from Florence, Italy. Thomas met Nataraja Guru at the Geneva Quaker meeting, where she acted as clerk, and he came to teach at the school, overlapping there with the New York educator Truda Theresa Weil; Weil covered the school in her 1930 master's thesis at New York University. In autumn 1927 Thomas was in the USA, visiting Friendship House in Washington, D.C..

=== Pupils ===
The Italian writer and translator Gioconda Salvadori (Joyce Lussu; 1912–1998) attended the school, in its "multicultural and multilingual environment", between periods of homeschooling. Georgia Lloyd was at the school 1926 to 1928, while her mother Lola Maverick Lloyd was doing peace work in Switzerland.

Karen Horney's daughter Marianne was sent away "to a Quaker school on Lake Geneva, where the meals were vegetarian, the teachers were called by Indian names of respect, and part of each day was spent in meditation." Abner Carroll Binder, foreign correspondent of the Chicago Daily News in Rome, and his wife Dorothy, took their children to the school in 1933, not having been able to find a suitable Montessori school:

Barefoot the whole time, they learned to swim like fish, and found that fire crackers and bonfires were not confined to Independence Day in America, but that Bastille Day in France across the lake, and Republic Day in Switzerland are equally exciting.

=== Events ===
A summer school was held for "peace workers", 26 July to 4 September 1926. It was followed in September 1927 by a summer school on race relations, organised by the French section of the WILPF at the Fellowship School.

The World Alliance of Reformed Churches held an International Youth Conference at the school in 1932. It was organised by Pierre-Charles Toureille, Dietrich Bonhoeffer, and Thomas Craske. Among the 60 participants was Charles Freer Andrews. Valdemar Ammundsen wrote of the "four or five rather heterogeneous buildings".

=== Aftermath ===
The International Fellowship School had closed by 1936, but the establishment was by then playing a role in sending German-Jewish former pupils to other schools, particularly the Great Ayton Friends' School in England. That year the school was taken over by the Bondy family, with Gertrud Bondy, mother of Annemarie Roeper, moving to Switzerland to set up a new school in the premises at Gland, supported by Harald Baruschke, while her husband Max Bondy and Annemarie continued at their school Marienau, in Germany at Dahlenburg, which was subject to a forced sale completed in 1937. The Bondy family emigrated to the USA in 1939.

== Later life ==
Leaving the school, Thomas returned to London. During World War II she worked with evacuees, and Italian prisoners of war in England. Towards the end of the war she went to Rome to collaborate with Carleton Washburne on the reform of the Italian educational system. She taught in schools, and organised for the Quakers.

Encountering Aldo Capitini at non-violence meetings, Thomas became interested in his Religious Orientation Centre set up in Perugia. She purchased an apartment there, ran regular meetings, and helped set up the Società vegetariana italiana (Italian Vegetarian Society). She continued to work as a teacher, and was an organiser for Capitini's causes, until hospitalised in 1959.

Emma Thomas died on 23 July 1960 in Perugia. Capitani wrote that she was a self-described "practical idealist", and was notable for the way she valued individuality, as well as understanding his Religious Orientation Centre and other concepts.
