= William Bross Lloyd =

American lawyer

- Lloyd as he appeared at the time of his 1920 Chicago trial
- Born: William Bross Lloyd; February 24, 1875; Chicago, Illinois, U.S.
- Died: June 30, 1946 (aged 71); Boston, Massachusetts, U.S.
- Political party: Socialist (1906–1919); Communist Labor (1919-1923)
- Spouses: Lola Maverick Lloyd (m. 1902; div. 1916); Madge Bird (m. 1918)
- Children: William Bross Jr.

William Bross Lloyd (February 24, 1875 – June 30, 1946) was an American attorney and political activist. The oldest son of the muckraking journalist Henry Demarest Lloyd and Jessie Bross, daughter of Chicago Tribune founder William Bross, William Bross Lloyd is best remembered as a founding member and financial angel of the fledgling Communist Labor Party of America, forerunner of the Communist Party USA.

== Biography ==
=== Early years ===
William Bross Lloyd Sr. was born February 24, 1875, in Chicago, Illinois. He was the oldest son of muckraking progressive journalist Henry Demarest Lloyd and Jessie Bross, daughter of Chicago Tribune founder William Bross, through whom he ultimately inherited a valuable one-quarter share of the newspaper.

Lloyd attended Harvard College from which he graduated in 1898. Thereafter he enrolled at Harvard Law School, completing his studies there in 1902 and continuing to practice law in the states of Massachusetts and Illinois.

While at Harvard Lloyd met his fellow student Lola Maverick and the couple married in November 1902. The couple traveled briefly following their marriage before setting up house in Chicago, where William intended to begin practicing law. The couple would have four children, three girls and a son, before a bitter divorce in 1916. Lloyd would remarry to Madge Bird following the divorce and fathered one more son in 1918 by his second wife.

=== Political activism ===
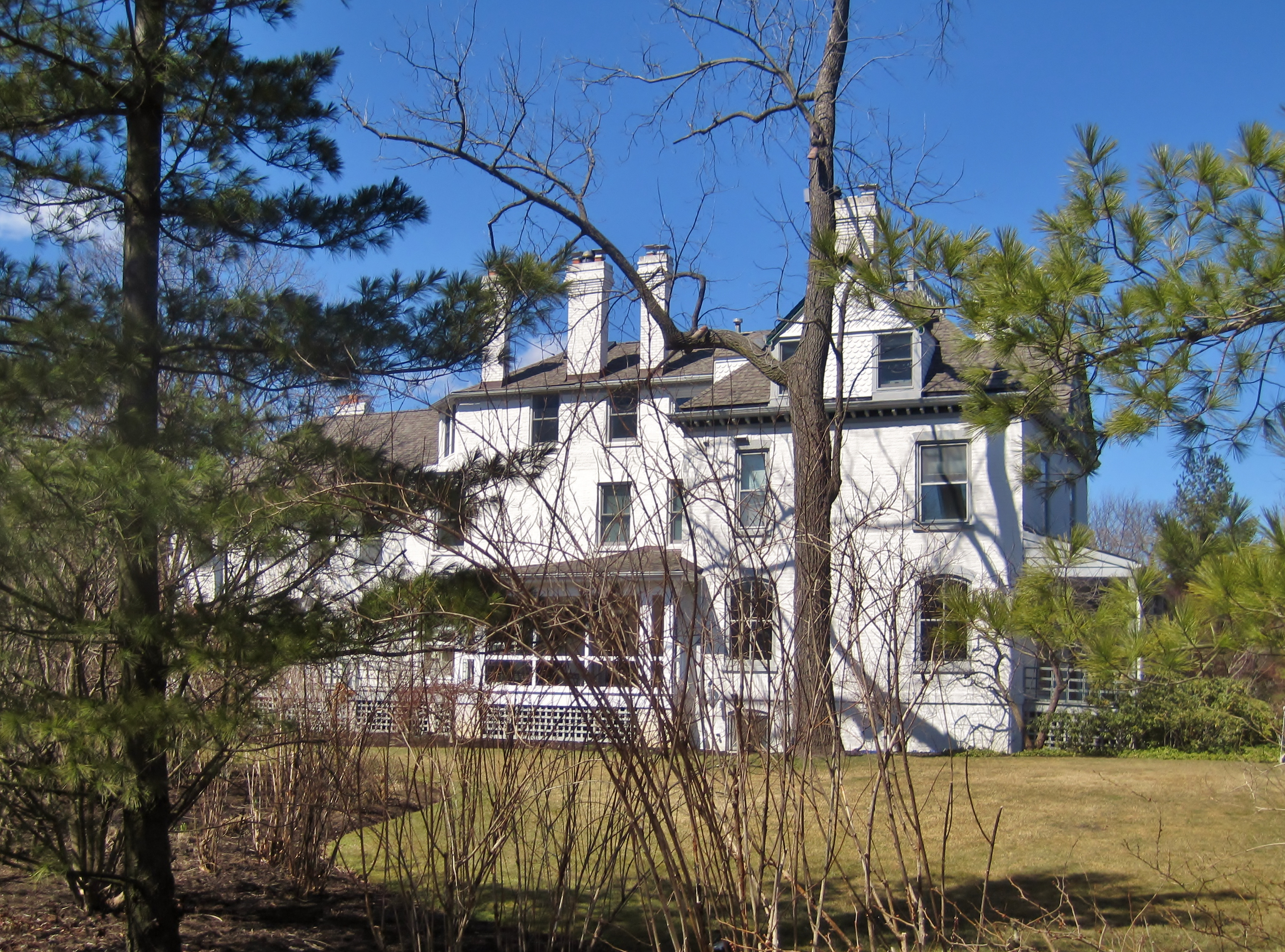
The home of William Bross Lloyd and his wife, Lola Maverick Lloyd in Winnetka, Illinois. Still standing today, the 16-room mansion sold for nearly $2 million in 2013.

Following his father's death in September 1903, William decided to enter politics himself, giving up plans on practicing law to instead become an activist in the movement for public ownership of the municipal railway system — the primary mode of civic transportation in the pre-automotive era. While Lloyd's father, Henry Demarest Lloyd, had long been a member of the socialist movement, as a youth William Bross Lloyd was not a member of the Socialist Party of America or its youth section, joining the organization only in 1906. Lloyd would remain a political activist for the better part of the next two decades.

In 1918, William Bross Lloyd entered the world of practical politics for himself, running for United States Senate on the Socialist Party ticket.

Lloyd was a member of one of the earliest explicitly Bolshevik political organizations in the United States, the Communist Propaganda League, established in Chicago in 1918. Lloyd's personal secretary, attorney Isaac Edward Ferguson, was the founding secretary of that same organization.

Lloyd was elected to the 15-member National Executive Committee which governed the Socialist Party in early 1919, but the results of the election — which would have turned control of the party and its assets to an insurgent left wing — were overturned and ignored by the outgoing NEC in June and he never assumed office.

Following the split of the left wing from the Socialist Party in the summer of 1919, Lloyd became a founding member of the Communist Labor Party of America. After just three months of public existence this organization was subjected to government repression as one of the targets of the Palmer Raids of January 2/3, 1920, and was driven underground.

Lloyd would be one of 20 Communists tried for conspiring to overthrow the US government in a major Chicago trial, which was prosecuted by future Chicago judge Frank D. Comerford and defended by celebrated attorney Clarence Darrow. The trial, which ran from May 10 to August 2, 1920, resulted in convictions for all of the defendants. Lloyd received a sentence of from 1 to 5 years in prison but remained free on bail pending resolution of the appeal process. Though the appeals process was exhausted in 1922, Lloyd was no longer seen as a threatening advocate of communism by that date and his sentence was accordingly commuted.

Lloyd posted bail for Big Bill Haywood for his 1921 trial. Haywood skipped bail while out on appeal and fled to the Russian SFSR. The $15,000 bail was forfeited as a result of Haywood's flight.

=== Death and legacy ===
William Bross Lloyd died of cancer on June 30, 1946, at the Ritz-Carlton Hotel in Boston. He was 71 years old at the time of his death. Lloyd's body was cremated and his ashes cast into the Atlantic Ocean by his surviving family.

Lloyd's papers, combined into one collection with those of his eldest son, prominent pacifist William Bross Lloyd Jr. (1908-1995), reside at the New York Public Library in New York City. The collection, totaling 24 linear feet of material, is housed in 41 archival boxes and includes writings, publications, photographs, and family correspondence.

== Works ==
- Peace: Now You See It and Now You Don't; or, That's All — The Prestidigitator. n.c. [Chicago?]: n.p., [c. 1917].
- The Socialist Party and Its Purposes. With Isaac Edward Ferguson. Chicago: Goodspeed Press, 1918.
- "Silence — And the Resurrection: A Letter from William Bross Lloyd" with "In Reply" by Max Eastman, The Liberator, vol. 1, no. 6 (Aug. 1918), pp. 30–32.
