= Afroyim v. Rusk =

- Supreme Court of the United States

Argued February 20, 1967 Decided May 29, 1967
- Full case name: Beys Afroyim v. Dean Rusk, Secretary of State
- Citations: 387 U.S. 253 (more) 87 S. Ct. 1660; 18 L. Ed. 2d 757; 1967 U.S. LEXIS 2844

Case history
- Prior: 250 F. Supp. 686 (S.D.N.Y. 1966); 361 F.2d 102 (2nd Cir. 1966); cert. granted, 385 U.S. 917 (1966)

Holding
- Congress has no power under the Constitution to revoke a person's U.S. citizenship unless he voluntarily relinquishes it. In particular, citizenship may not be revoked as a consequence of voting in a foreign election.

Court membership
- Chief Justice Earl Warren Associate Justices Hugo Black · William O. Douglas; Tom C. Clark · John M. Harlan II; William J. Brennan Jr. · Potter Stewart; Byron White · Abe Fortas

Case opinions
- Majority: Black, joined by Warren, Douglas, Brennan, Fortas
- Dissent: Harlan, joined by Clark, Stewart, White

Laws applied
- Nationality Act of 1940; U.S. Const. amends. V, XIV
- This case overturned a previous ruling or rulings
- Perez v. Brownell (1958)

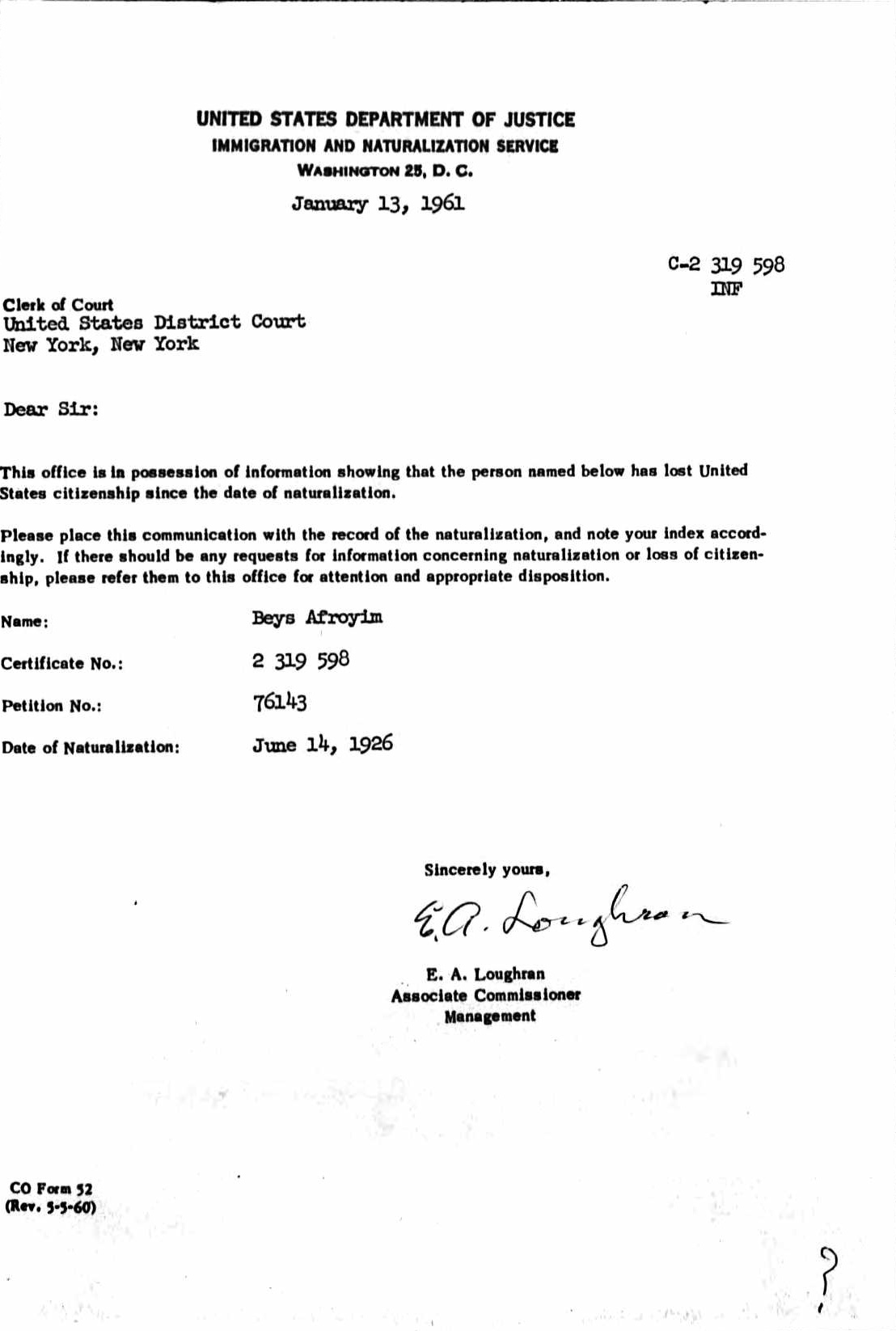
A 1961 letter from the U.S. Immigration and Naturalization Service reporting Beys Afroyim's loss of citizenship

Afroyim v. Rusk, 387 U.S. 253 (1967), is a landmark decision of the Supreme Court of the United States, which ruled that citizens of the United States may not be deprived of their citizenship involuntarily. The U.S. government had attempted to revoke the citizenship of Beys Afroyim, a man born in Poland, because he had cast a vote in an Israeli election after becoming a naturalized U.S. citizen. The Supreme Court decided that Afroyim's right to retain his citizenship was guaranteed by the Citizenship Clause of the Fourteenth Amendment to the Constitution. In so doing, the Court struck down a federal law mandating loss of U.S. citizenship for voting in a foreign election—thereby overruling one of its own precedents, Perez v. Brownell (1958), in which it had upheld loss of citizenship under similar circumstances less than a decade earlier.

The Afroyim decision opened the way for a wider acceptance of dual (or multiple) citizenship in United States law. The Bancroft Treaties—a series of agreements between the United States and other nations which had sought to limit dual citizenship following naturalization—were eventually abandoned after the Carter administration concluded that Afroyim and other Supreme Court decisions had rendered them unenforceable.

The impact of Afroyim v. Rusk was narrowed by a later case, Rogers v. Bellei (1971), in which the Court determined that the Fourteenth Amendment safeguarded citizenship only when a person was born or naturalized in the United States, and that Congress retained authority to regulate the citizenship status of a person who was born outside the United States to an American parent. However, the specific law at issue in Rogers v. Bellei—a requirement for a minimum period of U.S. residence that Bellei had failed to satisfy—was repealed by Congress in 1978. As a consequence of revised policies adopted in 1990 by the United States Department of State, it is now (in the words of one expert) "virtually impossible to lose American citizenship without formally and expressly renouncing it."

== Background ==
=== Early history of United States citizenship law ===
Citizenship in the United States has historically been acquired in one of three ways: by birth in the United States (jus soli, "right of the soil"); by birth outside the United States to an American parent (jus sanguinis, "right of the blood"); or by immigration to the United States followed by naturalization.

In 1857, the Supreme Court held in Dred Scott v. Sandford that African slaves, former slaves, and their descendants were not eligible to be citizens. After the Civil War (1861–1865) and the resulting abolition of slavery in the United States by the Thirteenth Amendment, steps were taken to grant citizenship to the freed slaves. Congress first enacted the Civil Rights Act of 1866, which included a clause declaring "all persons born in the United States and not subject to any foreign power" to be citizens. Even as the Civil Rights Act was being debated in Congress, its opponents argued that the citizenship provision was unconstitutional. In light of this concern, as well as to protect the new grant of citizenship for former slaves from being repealed by a later Congress, the drafters of the Fourteenth Amendment to the Constitution included a Citizenship Clause, which would entrench in the Constitution (and thereby set beyond the future reach of Congress or the courts) a guarantee of citizenship stating that "All persons born or naturalized in the United States, and subject to the jurisdiction thereof, are citizens of the United States". The Fourteenth Amendment—including the Citizenship Clause—was ratified by state legislatures and became a part of the Constitution in 1868.

=== Loss of United States citizenship ===
The Constitution does not specifically deal with loss of citizenship. An amendment proposed by Congress in 1810—the Titles of Nobility Amendment—would, if ratified, have provided that any citizen who accepted any "present, pension, office or emolument" from a foreign country, without the consent of Congress, would "cease to be a citizen of the United States"; however, this amendment was never ratified by a sufficient number of state legislatures and, as a result, never became a part of the Constitution.

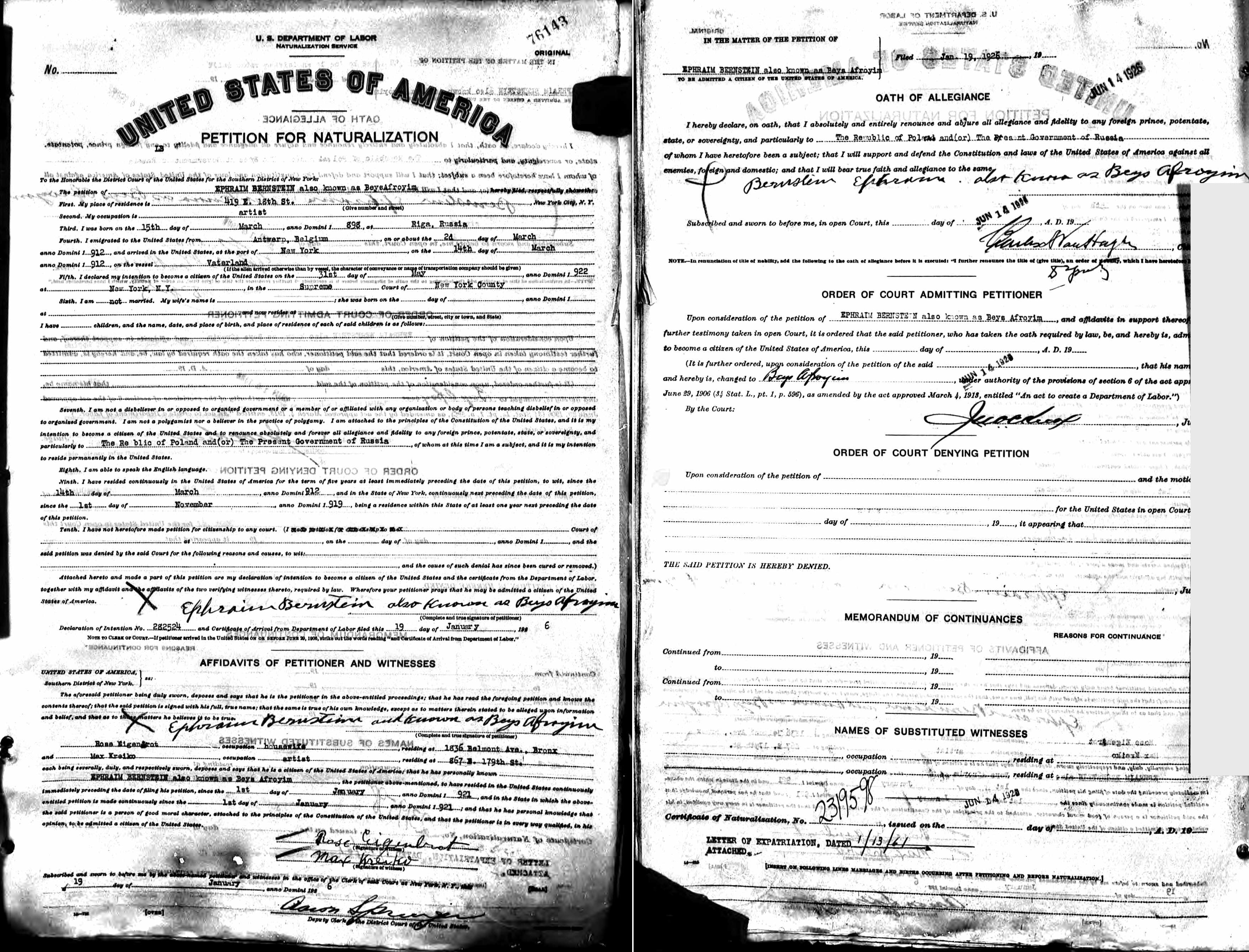
Official record of Beys Afroyim's U.S. naturalization in 1926

In the Expatriation Act of 1868, Congress declared that individuals born in the United States had an inherent right to expatriation (giving up of citizenship). It has historically been accepted that certain actions could result in loss of citizenship. The possibility of this was noted by the Supreme Court in United States v. Wong Kim Ark, an 1898 case involving the citizenship of a man born in the United States to Chinese parents who were legally domiciled in the country. After ruling in this case that Wong was born a U.S. citizen despite his Chinese ancestry, the Court went on to state that his birthright citizenship "[had] not been lost or taken away by anything happening since his birth." By making this statement, the Supreme Court affirmed that Wong had not done anything to result in the loss of United States citizenship, therefore acknowledging that there were actions that could result in the loss of citizenship.

The Nationality Act of 1940 provided for loss of citizenship based on foreign military or government service, when coupled with citizenship in that foreign country. This statute also mandated loss of citizenship for desertion from the U.S. armed forces, remaining outside the United States in order to evade military service during wartime, or voting in a foreign election. The provision calling for loss of citizenship for foreign military service was held by the Supreme Court not to be enforceable without proof that said service had been voluntary, in a 1958 case (Nishikawa v. Dulles), and revocation of citizenship as a punishment for desertion was struck down that same year in another case (Trop v. Dulles).

However, in yet another 1958 case (Perez v. Brownell), the Supreme Court affirmed the provision revoking the citizenship of any American who had voted in an election in a foreign country, as a legitimate exercise (under the Constitution's Necessary and Proper Clause) of Congress' authority to regulate foreign affairs and avoid potentially embarrassing diplomatic situations. Associate Justice Felix Frankfurter, the author of the opinion of the Court (supported by a 5–4 majority), wrote that:

... the activities of the citizens of one nation when in another country can easily cause serious embarrassments to the government of their own country as well as to their fellow citizens. We cannot deny to Congress the reasonable belief that these difficulties might well become acute, to the point of jeopardizing the successful conduct of international relations, when a citizen of one country chooses to participate in the political or governmental affairs of another country. The citizen may by his action unwittingly promote or encourage a course of conduct contrary to the interests of his own government; moreover, the people or government of the foreign country may regard his action to be the action of his government, or at least as a reflection if not an expression of its policy.... It follows that such activity is regulable by Congress under its power to deal with foreign affairs.

In a dissenting opinion, Chief Justice Earl Warren argued that "Citizenship is man's basic right, for it is nothing less than the right to have rights" and that "a government of the people cannot take away their citizenship simply because one branch of that government can be said to have a conceivably rational basis for wanting to do so." While Warren was willing to allow for loss of citizenship as a result of foreign naturalization or other actions "by which [an American] manifests allegiance to a foreign state [which] may be so inconsistent with the retention of [U.S.] citizenship as to result in loss of that status", he wrote that "In specifying that any act of voting in a foreign political election results in loss of citizenship, Congress has employed a classification so broad that it encompasses conduct that fails to show a voluntary abandonment of American citizenship."

Two Supreme Court decisions after Perez called into question the principle that loss of citizenship could occur even without the affected individual's intent. In Kennedy v. Mendoza-Martinez (1963), the Court struck down a law revoking citizenship for remaining outside the United States in order to avoid conscription into the armed forces. Associate Justice William J. Brennan (who had been in the majority in Perez) wrote a separate opinion concurring with the majority in Mendoza-Martinez and expressing reservations about Perez. In Schneider v. Rusk (1964), where the Court invalidated a provision revoking the citizenship of naturalized citizens who returned to live permanently in their countries of origin, Brennan recused himself and did not participate in the decision of the case.

=== Beys Afroyim ===
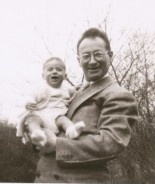
A 1947 photo of Beys Afroyim and his infant son Amos

Beys Afroyim (born Ephraim Bernstein, 1893–1984) was an artist and active communist. Various sources state that he was born in either 1893 or 1898, and either in Poland generally, specifically in the Polish town of Ryki, or in Riga, Latvia (then part of the Russian Empire). In 1912, Afroyim immigrated to the United States, and on June 14, 1926, he was naturalized as a U.S. citizen. He studied at the Art Institute of Chicago, as well as the National Academy of Design in New York City, and he was commissioned to paint portraits of George Bernard Shaw, Theodore Dreiser, and Arnold Schoenberg. In 1949, Afroyim left the United States and settled in Israel, together with his wife and former student Soshana (an Austrian artist).

In 1960, following the breakdown of his marriage, Afroyim decided to return to the United States, but the State Department refused to renew his U.S. passport, ruling that because Afroyim had voted in the 1951 Israeli legislative election, he had lost his citizenship under the provisions of the Nationality Act of 1940. A letter certifying Afroyim's loss of citizenship was issued by the Immigration and Naturalization Service (INS) on January 13, 1961.

Afroyim challenged the revocation of his citizenship. Initially, he claimed that he had not voted in Israel's 1951 election but had entered the polling place solely in order to draw sketches of voters casting their ballots. Afroyim's initial challenge was rejected in administrative proceedings in 1965. He then sued in federal district court, with his lawyer agreeing to a stipulation that Afroyim had in fact voted in Israel, but arguing that the statute under which this action had resulted in his losing his citizenship was unconstitutional. A federal judge of the United States District Court for the Southern District of New York rejected Afroyim's claim on February 25, 1966, concluding that "in the opinion of Congress voting in a foreign political election could import 'allegiance to another country' in some measure 'inconsistent with American citizenship'" and that the question of this law's validity had been settled by the Supreme Court's 1958 Perez decision.

Afroyim appealed the district court's ruling against him to the Second Circuit Court of Appeals, which upheld the lower court's reasoning and decision on May 24, 1966. Two of the three judges who heard Afroyim's appeal found the district court's analysis and affirmation of Perez to be "exhaustive and most penetrating". The third judge expressed serious reservations regarding the viability of Perez and suggested that Afroyim might have obtained a different result if he had framed his case differently, but decided to concur (albeit reluctantly) in the majority's ruling.

=== Arguments before the Supreme Court ===
After losing his appeal to the Second Circuit, Afroyim asked the Supreme Court to overrule the precedent it had established in Perez, strike down the foreign voting provision of the Nationality Act as unconstitutional, and decide that he was still a United States citizen. Afroyim's counsel argued that since "neither the Fourteenth Amendment nor any other provision of the Constitution expressly grants Congress the power to take away [U.S.] citizenship once it has been acquired ... the only way [Afroyim] could lose his citizenship was by his own voluntary renunciation of it." The Supreme Court agreed to consider Afroyim's case on October 24, 1966 and held oral arguments on February 20, 1967.

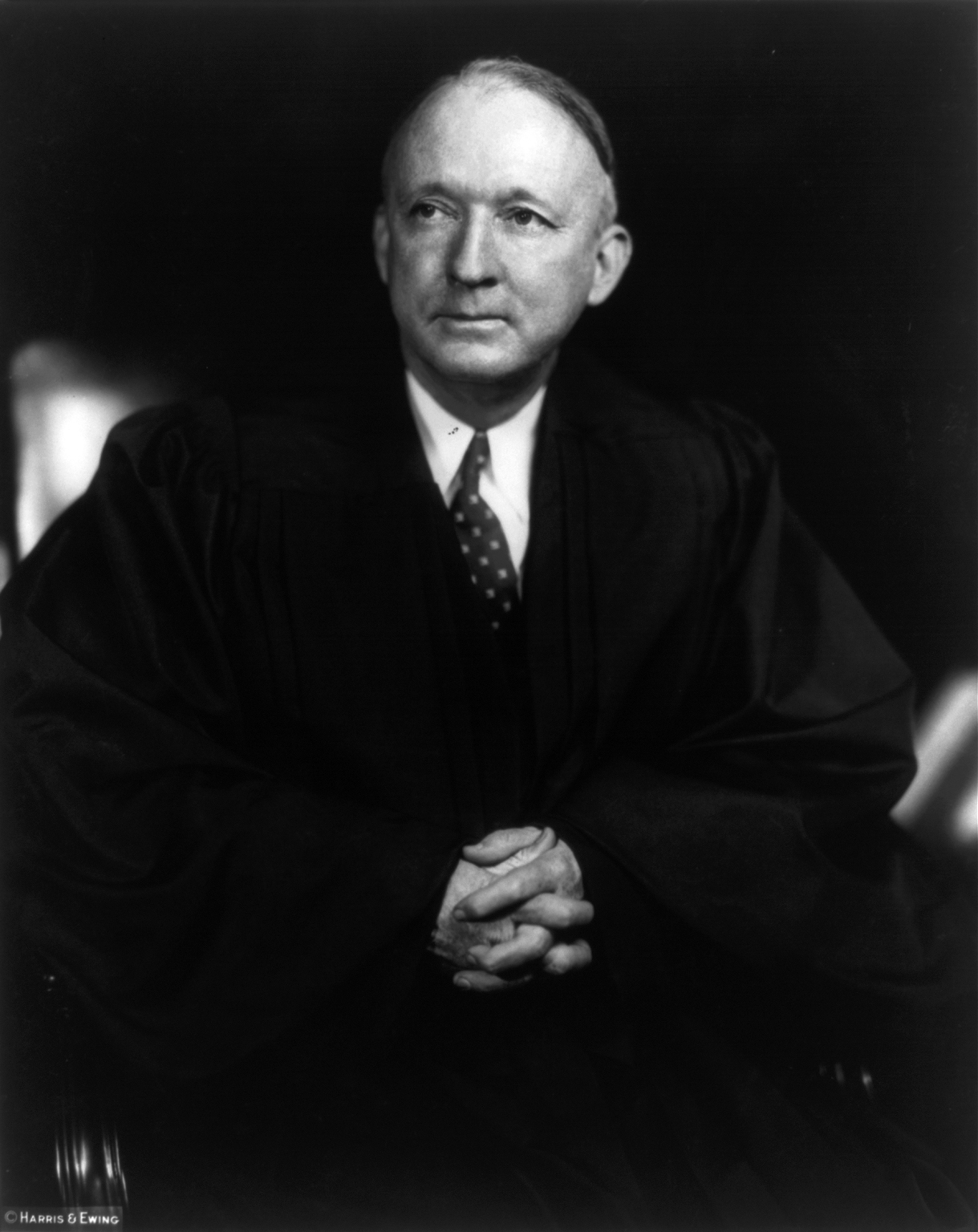
Hugo Black wrote the opinion of the Court in the Afroyim case.

The official respondent (defendant) in Afroyim's case on behalf of the U.S. government was Dean Rusk, the Secretary of State during the Kennedy and Johnson administrations (1961–1969). The legal brief laying out Afroyim's arguments was written by Nanette Dembitz, general counsel of the New York Civil Liberties Union; the government's brief was written by United States Solicitor General (and future Supreme Court Associate Justice) Thurgood Marshall. The oral arguments in the case were presented by attorneys Edward Ennis—chairman of the American Civil Liberties Union (ACLU)—for Afroyim, and Charles Gordon—general counsel for the INS—for the government. Afroyim was in New York City at this time, having been granted a visitor's visa in 1965 while his case went through the courts.

Before heading the ACLU, Ennis had served as general counsel for the INS. In his oral argument supporting Afroyim, Ennis asserted that Congress lacked the power to prescribe forfeiture of citizenship, and he sharply criticized the foreign-relations argument under which the Perez court had upheld loss of citizenship for voting in a foreign election—pointing out, for example, that when a referendum was held in 1935 on the status of the Saar (a region of Germany occupied after World War I by the United Kingdom and France), Americans had participated in the voting without raising any concerns within the State Department at the time.

Gordon did not make a good showing in the Afroyim oral arguments despite his skill and experience in the field of immigration law, according to a 2005 article on the Afroyim case by law professor Peter J. Spiro. Gordon mentioned Israeli elections in 1955 and 1959 in which Afroyim had voted—facts which had not previously been presented to the Supreme Court in the attorneys' briefs or the written record of the case—and much of the remaining questioning from the justices involved criticism of Gordon for confusing matters through the last-minute introduction of this new material.

Afroyim's earlier stipulation that he had voted in the 1951 Israeli election—together with an accompanying concession by the government that this was the sole ground upon which it had acted to revoke Afroyim's citizenship—allowed the potential issue of diluted allegiance through dual citizenship to be sidestepped. Indeed, in 1951 there was no Israeli nationality law; eligibility to vote in the election that year had been based on residence rather than any concept of citizenship. Although Afroyim had later acquired Israeli citizenship and voted in at least two other elections in his new country, his lawyers were able to avoid discussing this matter and instead focus entirely on whether foreign voting was a sufficient cause for loss of one's U.S. citizenship.

== Opinion of the Court ==
The Supreme Court ruled in Afroyim's favor in a 5–4 decision issued on May 29, 1967. The opinion of the Court—written by Associate Justice Hugo Black, and joined by Chief Justice Warren and Associate Justices William O. Douglas and Abe Fortas—as well as Associate Justice Brennan, who had been part of the majority in Perez—was grounded in the reasoning Warren had used nine years earlier in his Perez dissent. The court's majority now held that "Congress has no power under the Constitution to divest a person of his United States citizenship absent his voluntary renunciation thereof." Specifically repudiating Perez, the majority of the justices rejected the claim that Congress had any power to revoke citizenship and said that "no such power can be sustained as an implied attribute of sovereignty". Instead, quoting from the Citizenship Clause, Black wrote:

"All persons born or naturalized in the United States ... are citizens of the United States...." There is no indication in these words of a fleeting citizenship, good at the moment it is acquired but subject to destruction by the Government at any time. Rather the Amendment can most reasonably be read as defining a citizenship which a citizen keeps unless he voluntarily relinquishes it. Once acquired, this Fourteenth Amendment citizenship was not to be shifted, canceled, or diluted at the will of the Federal Government, the States, or any other governmental unit.

The Court found support for its position in the history of the unratified Titles of Nobility Amendment. The fact that this 1810 proposal had been framed as a constitutional amendment, rather than an ordinary act of Congress, was seen by the majority as showing that, even before the passage of the Fourteenth Amendment, Congress did not believe that it had the power to revoke anyone's citizenship. The Court further noted that a proposed 1818 act of Congress would have provided a way for citizens to voluntarily relinquish their citizenship, but opponents had argued that Congress had no authority to provide for expatriation.

Afroyim's counsel had addressed only the foreign voting question and had carefully avoided any direct challenge to the idea that foreign naturalization might legitimately lead to loss of citizenship (a concept which Warren had been willing to accept in his Perez dissent). Nevertheless, the Court's Afroyim ruling went beyond even Warren's earlier position—holding instead that "The very nature of our government makes it completely incongruous to have a rule of law under which a group of citizens temporarily in office can deprive another group of citizens of their citizenship."

In sum Justice Black concluded:

In our country the people are sovereign and the Government cannot sever its relationship to the people by taking away their citizenship. Our Constitution governs us and we must never forget that our Constitution limits the Government to those powers specifically granted or those that are necessary and proper to carry out the specifically granted ones. The Constitution, of course, grants Congress no express power to strip people of their citizenship, whether, in the exercise of the implied power to regulate foreign affairs or in the exercise of any specifically granted power. [...] Citizenship is no light trifle to be jeopardized any moment Congress decides to do so under the name of one of its general or implied grants of power. In some instances, loss of citizenship can mean that a man is left without the protection of citizenship in any country in the world – as a man without a country. Citizenship in this Nation is a part of a cooperative affair. Its citizenry is the country, and the country is its citizenry. The very nature of our free government makes it completely incongruous to have a rule of law under which a group of citizens temporarily in office can deprive another group of citizens of their citizenship. We hold that the Fourteenth Amendment was designed to, and does, protect every citizen of this Nation against a congressional forcible destruction of his citizenship, whatever his creed, color, or race. Our holding does no more than to give to this citizen that which is his own, a constitutional right to remain a citizen in a free country unless he voluntarily relinquishes that citizenship.

=== Dissent ===
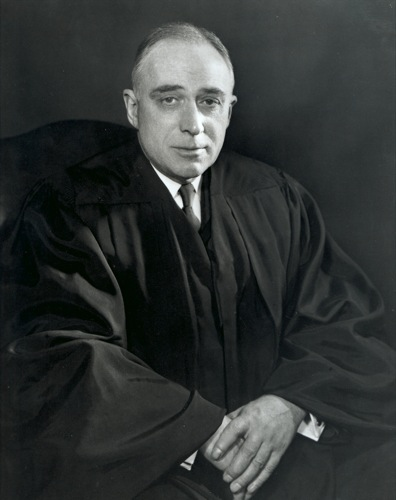
John Marshall Harlan II wrote the dissent in the Afroyim case.

The minority—in a dissent written by Associate Justice John Marshall Harlan II and joined by Associate Justices Tom C. Clark, Potter Stewart, and Byron White—argued that Perez had been correctly decided, that nothing in the Constitution deprived Congress of the power to revoke a person's citizenship for good cause, and that Congress was within its rights to decide that allowing Americans to vote in foreign elections ran contrary to the foreign policy interests of the nation and ought to result in loss of citizenship. Harlan wrote:

First, the Court fails almost entirely to dispute the reasoning in Perez; it is essentially content with the conclusory and quite unsubstantiated assertion that Congress is without "any general power, express or implied," to expatriate a citizen "without his assent." Next, the Court embarks upon a lengthy, albeit incomplete, survey of the historical background of the congressional power at stake here, and yet, at the end, concedes that the history is susceptible of "conflicting inferences." ... Finally, the Court declares that its result is bottomed upon the "language and the purpose" of the Citizenship Clause of the Fourteenth Amendment; in explanation, the Court offers only the terms of the clause itself, the contention that any other result would be "completely incongruous," and the essentially arcane observation that the "citizenry is the country and the country is its citizenry." I can find nothing in this extraordinary series of circumventions which permits, still less compels, the imposition of this constitutional constraint upon the authority of Congress.

Responding to the assertion that Congress did not have power to revoke a person's citizenship without his or her assent, Harlan predicted that "Until the Court indicates with greater precision what it means by 'assent', today's opinion will surely cause still greater confusion in this area of the law."

== Subsequent developments ==
The Afroyim decision stated that no one with United States citizenship could be involuntarily deprived of that citizenship. Nevertheless, the Court distinguished a 1971 case, Rogers v. Bellei, holding in this newer case that individuals who had acquired citizenship via jus sanguinis, through birth outside the United States to an American parent or parents, could still risk loss of citizenship in various ways, since their citizenship (unlike Afroyim's citizenship) was the result of federal statutes rather than the Citizenship Clause. The statutory provision whereby Bellei lost his citizenship—a U.S. residency requirement which he had failed to satisfy in his youth—was repealed by Congress in 1978; the foreign voting provision, already without effect since Afroyim, was repealed at the same time.

Although Afroyim appeared to rule out any involuntary revocation of a person's citizenship, the government continued for the most part to pursue loss-of-citizenship cases when an American had acted in a way believed to imply an intent to give up citizenship—especially when an American had become a naturalized citizen of another country. In a 1980 case, however—Vance v. Terrazas—the Supreme Court ruled that intent to relinquish citizenship needed to be proved by itself, and not simply inferred from an individual's having voluntarily performed an action designated by Congress as being incompatible with an intent to keep one's citizenship.

The concept of dual citizenship, which previously had been strongly opposed by the U.S. government, has become more accepted in the years since Afroyim. In 1980, the administration of President Jimmy Carter concluded that the Bancroft Treaties—a series of bilateral agreements, formulated between 1868 and 1937, which provided for automatic loss of citizenship upon foreign naturalization of a U.S. citizen—were no longer enforceable, due in part to Afroyim, and gave notice terminating these treaties. In 1990, the State Department adopted new guidelines for evaluating potential loss-of-citizenship cases, under which the government now assumes in almost all situations that Americans do not in fact intend to give up their citizenship unless they explicitly indicate to U.S. officials that this is their intention. As explained by Peter J. Spiro, "In the long run, Afroyim's vision of an absolute right to retain citizenship has been largely, if quietly, vindicated. As a matter of practice, it is now virtually impossible to lose American citizenship without formally and expressly renouncing it."

While acknowledging that "American citizenship enjoys strong protection against loss under Afroyim and Terrazas", retired journalist Henry S. Matteo suggested, "It would have been more equitable ... had the Supreme Court relied on the Eighth Amendment, which adds a moral tone as well as a firmer constitutional basis, than the Fourteenth." Matteo also said, "Under Afroyim there is a lack of balance between rights and protections on one hand, and obligations and responsibilities on the other, all four elements of which have been an integral part of the concept of citizenship, as history shows." Political scientist P. Allan Dionisopoulos wrote that "it is doubtful that any [Supreme Court decision] created a more complex problem for the United States than Afroyim v. Rusk", a decision which he believed had "since become a source of embarrassment for the United States in its relationships with the Arab world" because of the way it facilitated dual U.S.–Israeli citizenship and participation by Americans in Israel's armed forces.

After his Supreme Court victory, Afroyim divided his time between West Brighton (Staten Island, New York) and the Israeli city of Safed until his death on May 19, 1984, in West Brighton.

== See also ==
- List of United States Supreme Court cases, volume 387
- Reid v. Covert, a Supreme Court case holding that treaties cannot override the Constitution
