= Nationality Act of 1940 =

United States Act of Congress

- Long title: An Act to revise and codify the nationality laws of the United States into a comprehensive nationality code.
- Enacted by: the 76th United States Congress
- Effective: October 14, 1940

Citations
- Public law: Pub. L. 76–853
- Statutes at Large: 54 Stat. 1137, Chap. 876

Legislative history
- Introduced in the House as H.R. 9980 by Samuel Dickstein (D–NY) on June 5, 1940; Committee consideration by U.S. House Committee on Immigration and Naturalization, U.S. Senate Committee on Immigration and Naturalization; Passed the House on September 11, 1940 (Passed); Passed the Senate on September 30, 1940 (Passed); Reported by the joint conference committee on October 1, 1940; agreed to by the Senate on October 4, 1940 (Agreed) and by the House on October 4, 1940 (Agreed); Signed into law by President Franklin D. Roosevelt on October 14, 1940

United States Supreme Court cases
- Perez v. Brownell, 356 U.S. 44 (1958); Trop v. Dulles, 356 U.S. 86 (1958); Afroyim v. Rusk, 387 U.S. 253 (1967)

The Nationality Act of 1940 (H.R. 9980; Pub.L. 76-853; 54 Stat. 1137) revised numerous provisions of law relating to American citizenship and naturalization. It was enacted by the 76th Congress of the United States and signed into law on October 14, 1940, a year after World War II had begun in Europe, but before the U.S. entered the war.

The law revised "the existing nationality laws of the U.S. into a more complete nationality code"; it defined those persons who were "eligible for citizenship through birth or naturalization" and clarified "the status of individuals and their children born or residing in the continental U.S., its territories such as Alaska, Hawaii, Puerto Rico, the Virgin Islands, the Philippines, Panama and the Canal Zone, or abroad." The law furthermore defined who was not eligible for citizenship, and how citizenship could be lost or terminated. This legislation represents the first attempt ever made, since the founding of the United States, to codify and unify all of the U.S. laws relating to nationality and naturalization.

This act was superseded by the Immigration and Nationality Act of 1952 and by later acts of Congress and executive orders.

== Contents ==
The law is divided into several chapters, as follows:

- Title I – "This Act may be cited as the Nationality Act of 1940."
  - Chapter I – Definitions
  - Chapter II – Nationality at Birth
  - Chapter III – Nationality through Naturalization
  - Chapter IV – Loss of Nationality
  - Chapter V – Miscellaneous
- Title II – "This Act shall take effect from and after ninety days from the date of its approval. Approved October 14, 1940."

== Major provisions ==
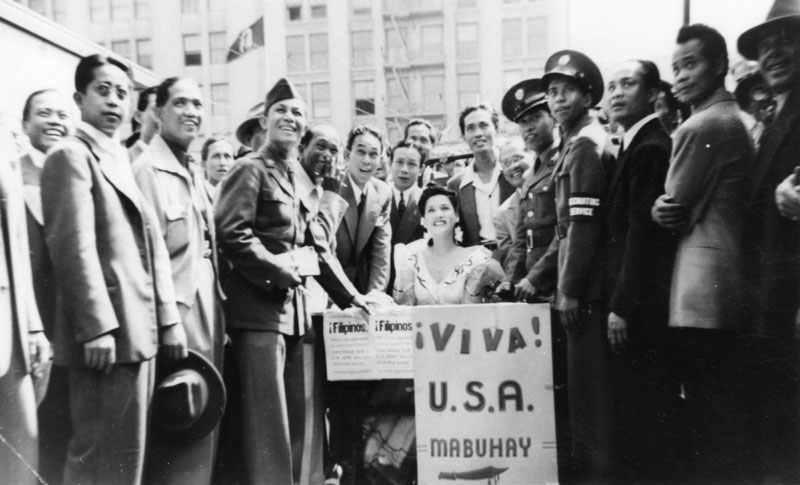
Filipino men celebrating their newly earned U.S. citizenship that was gained through the Nationality Act of 1940, due to their efforts of fighting for the U.S. in World War Two.

The Act has five chapters to it, each having provisions to what the process was to gain citizenship and to not lose it.

Chapter one of the act outlines the definition of terms used in the Act.

Chapters two and three are the largest parts of the Act and they deal with identifying eligibility for citizenship and specific residency requirements for people born abroad to one U.S. citizen parent, or non-citizens born in the U.S. or its territories.

The third chapter of the act goes into detail about nationality through naturalization, giving a further clarification of requirements for non-citizens seeking naturalization. It goes into detail with specifications concerning race, ethnicity, and basic verbal English proficiency along with residency requirements outlined.

The fourth chapter is about loss of nationality. Exceptions to residency requirements and removal of citizenship are made for those away in the employment of and under orders from the U.S. government or for other specific reasons, and loss of nationality by actions of children under the age of eighteen is prevented except when such a person is convicted of treason or fighting against or trying to overthrow the United States. Apart from such exceptions in the fourth part of the act there are many possible ways to lose citizenship by those who had gained it, many of which refer to the idea of not showing consistency with being a citizen either by leaving the country for periods of time or by taking up government positions in foreign states. This chapter of the Act also dictates that its provisions shall not override any existing treaty or convention to which the United States was a party.

The fifth and final chapter of the document deals with the miscellaneous, including the procedure for determination and notification of loss of nationality and a list of previous Acts and parts thereof to be repealed and superseded.

The 4th and 5th chapters were indirect tie-ins with the Alien Registration Act of 1940, also known as the Smith Act. The Smith Act, enacted June 29, 1940, set criminal penalties for advocating the overthrow of the U.S. government along with requiring all non-citizen adult residents to register with the government. The Nationality Act of 1940 would take it a step further and make it so that anyone suspected of advocating the overthrow of the U.S. government who had recently gained citizenship would lose that citizenship and face criminal penalties.

== Related laws ==
The law amended some provisions of the Immigration Act of 1924. The Nationality Act of 1940 was repealed and superseded by the Immigration and Nationality Act of 1952.

Section 401 (later Section 349(a)(8) of the 1952 law) provided that natural-born American citizens would lose their citizenship if convicted of military desertion during time of war. This was struck down by the United States Supreme Court in the case of Trop v. Dulles (1958) as being a violation of the Eighth Amendment prohibition of cruel and unusual punishment. In 1967, the Court held in Afroyim v. Rusk that a person cannot be deprived of citizenship without his or her consent; in particular, it ruled that a provision of the 1940 act for automatic loss of citizenship for voting in a foreign election was an unconstitutional violation of the Citizenship Clause of the Fourteenth Amendment.

Section 402 of the act provided for loss of citizenship by naturalized citizens who lived abroad. By October 1946, about 400 naturalized citizens from Britain had lost U.S. citizenship under that provision, primarily because they had returned to the United Kingdom during World War II and chose to settle there, while another 200 moved back to the United States in order to avoid losing their U.S. citizenship under this provision.

== See also ==
- Birthright citizenship in the United States of America
- Citizenship in the United States
- Jus soli
- Jus sanguinis
- Natural born citizen of the United States
- United States nationality law
