= Titles of Nobility Amendment =

Proposed U.S. Constitutional Amendment

The Titles of Nobility Amendment was a proposed amendment to the United States Constitution. The 11th Congress passed it on May 1, 1810, and submitted to the state legislatures for ratification. It would strip United States citizenship from any citizen who accepted a title of nobility from an "emperor, king, prince or foreign power". On two occasions between 1812 and 1816, it was within two states of the number needed to become part of the Constitution. Congress did not set a time limit for its ratification, so the amendment is still pending before the states.

== Text from Amendment ==
If any citizen of the United States shall accept, claim, receive or retain, any title of nobility or honour, or shall, without the consent of Congress, accept and retain any present, pension, office or emolument of any kind whatever, from any emperor, king, prince or foreign power, such person shall cease to be a citizen of the United States, and shall be incapable of holding any office of trust or profit under them, or either of them.

== Background ==
This proposed amendment would amplify both Article I, Section 9, Clause 8, which prohibits the federal government from issuing titles of nobility or honor, and Section 10, Clause 1, which prohibits the states from issuing them.

One theory for why the Congress proposed the amendment is that it was in response to the 1803 marriage of Napoleon Bonaparte's younger brother, Jerome, and Betsy Patterson of Baltimore, Maryland, who gave birth to a boy for whom she wanted aristocratic recognition from France. The child, named Jérôme Napoléon Bonaparte, was not born in the United States, but in the United Kingdom on July 7, 1805 – nevertheless, he would have held U.S. citizenship through his mother. Another theory is that his mother actually desired a title of nobility for herself and, indeed, she is referred to as the "Duchess of Baltimore" in many texts written about the amendment (not to be confused with Baron Baltimore, a British-Irish title with the city of Baltimore named after the 2nd baron). The marriage had been annulled in 1805 – well before the amendment's proposal by the 11th Congress. Nonetheless, Representative Nathaniel Macon of North Carolina is recorded to have said, when voting on the amendment, that "he considered the vote on this question as deciding whether or not we were to have members of the Legion of Honor in this country." The purpose of this Amendment was to prevent those holding foreign titles, and thus the allegiance demanded by those titles, from being able to run for an office of government in the newly created Republic. This was out of fear that the foreign powers bestowing those titles would use them as markers to call in favors to either pass or impede the passing of unfavorable laws.

== Legislative and ratification history ==
Ratification status Ratified amendment Rejected amendment

The Titles of Nobility Amendment was introduced in the Senate by Democratic–Republican Senator Philip Reed of Maryland, was passed on April 27, 1810, by a vote of 19–5 and sent to the House of Representatives for its consideration. It was passed by the House on May 1, 1810, by a vote of 87–3. Having been approved by Congress, the proposed amendment was sent to the state legislatures for ratification and was ratified by the following states:

1. Maryland – December 25, 1810
2. Kentucky – January 31, 1811
3. Ohio – January 31, 1811
4. Delaware – February 2, 1811
5. Pennsylvania – February 6, 1811
6. New Jersey – February 13, 1811
7. Vermont – October 24, 1811
8. Tennessee – November 21, 1811
9. North Carolina – December 23, 1811
10. Georgia – December 31, 1811
11. Massachusetts – February 27, 1812
12. New Hampshire – December 9, 1812

The amendment was rejected by Virginia (February 14, 1811), New York (March 12, 1812), Connecticut (May 13, 1813), and Rhode Island (September 15, 1814). No other state legislature has completed ratification action on it.

When the proposed amendment was submitted to the states, ratification by 13 states was required for it to become part of the Constitution; 11 had done so by early 1812. At this point Louisiana was admitted as a state, raising the required number of states to 14.

On February 27, 1818, President James Monroe communicated to Congress the record shown above. He and Congress were both satisfied that the required number of ratifications had not been reached. A law, passed April 20, 1818, placed official responsibility for overseeing the amendment process into the hands of the Secretary of State, where it remained until 1950.

== Misconceptions ==
Some people (known as "Thirteenthers") have claimed that the Titles of Nobility Amendment actually became part of the Constitution. It in fact was mistakenly included as the "Thirteenth Amendment" in some early 19th-century printings of the Constitution. Between 1819 and 1867 the statutory law code of Virginia included it as well. This misconception has become significant because it is yoked with another misconception – that a lawyer's use of the word or abbreviation of "Esquire" is a title of nobility acquired from a foreign power – and so some litigants and others have tried to assert that lawyers have lost their citizenship or are disqualified from public office.

The error arose in 1815 when the Philadelphia printing house of Bioren and Duane published, under a government contract, a five-volume set titled Laws of the United States. On page 74 of the first volume, the proposed amendment was printed as "Article 13" along with the authentic Eleventh and Twelfth amendments. There was no indication on the page that Article 13 had not yet passed into law; however, earlier in the volume, on page ix of the Introduction, the editors said:

There has been some difficulty in ascertaining whether the amendment proposed, which is stated as the thirteenth, has or has not been adopted by a sufficient number of the state legislatures. ... It has been considered best, however, to publish the proposed amendment in its proper place, as if it had been adopted, with this explanation, to prevent misconception.

It appears that the Bioren and Duane set of federal laws being widely distributed as a standard reference, some compilers of other books copied its text of the Constitution and not remembering, or having skipped, the caveat in the Introduction, mistakenly included the Titles of Nobility Amendment as if it had been adopted as the Thirteenth Amendment. This error came to the attention of the U.S. House of Representatives in December 1817. At that time, the publisher of a pocket edition of the Constitution, printed under government contract, included the amendment as the Thirteenth Amendment, at which time the House requested that the President ascertain and report on the true status of the proposed amendment. Notwithstanding the official conclusion that the amendment had not been adopted, the erroneous printing of the proposed amendment as if adopted occasionally occurred (using the Americanized spelling and punctuation of Bioren and Duane, and omitting any ratification information just like Bioren and Duane) until some time after 1845. In 1845, the Bioren and Duane series of laws was replaced by an entirely new series, United States Statutes at Large, which printed the Constitution with only 12 amendments in volume 1 and put the unadopted Titles of Nobility Amendment among congressional resolutions in volume 2.

In 1833, Associate Justice Joseph Story of the U.S. Supreme Court published the text of the Constitution in his Commentaries on the Constitution. That publication included twelve amendments and a clear statement (in § 959) that there were only twelve amendments adopted. The text also included a statement (in § 1346) that the Titles of Nobility Amendment had not been adopted "probably from a growing sense that it is wholly unnecessary". In 1847, Associate Justice Levi Woodbury mentioned in a dissenting opinion that there "were only twelve amendments ever made to" the Constitution. In Dillon v. Gloss (1921), the Supreme Court explicitly described the Titles of Nobility Amendment as not having been adopted. In Coleman v. Miller (1939), the two dissenting Justices similarly described the Titles of Nobility Amendment as unadopted. In Afroyim v. Rusk (1967), the majority and dissenting opinions described it as unadopted.

On March 2, 1861, the Congress proposed the Corwin Amendment, which if adopted would have prevented any federal legislation, including a future proposed amendment to the Constitution, that would have interfered with or abolished slavery. It is significant that, although this proposal was already titled as the Thirteenth Amendment, no one claimed that there already was an adopted Thirteenth Amendment.

On February 1, 1865, the 38th Congress passed and sent to the states for ratification a proposed amendment that would become the Thirteenth Amendment, which abolished slavery. As with the Corwin Amendment, when what is now the Thirteenth Amendment was proposed and adopted, no one claimed that there already was an adopted Thirteenth Amendment.

The assertion that the Titles of Nobility Amendment has been ratified by the required number of states has never been upheld by any court in the United States. In the few instances in which courts have been confronted with the assertion that it was, those claims have been dismissed. In Campion v. Towns, a tax protester raised it in his defenses against a charge of tax evasion. The court replied that it would "correct any misunderstanding Plaintiff has concerning the text of the Thirteenth Amendment to the United States Constitution":

In his Complaint, Plaintiff includes a certified copy of the Thirteenth Amendment from the Colorado State Archives which was published in 1861. As included in that compilation, the Thirteenth Amendment would strip an individual of United States citizenship if they accept any title of nobility or honor. However, this is not the Thirteenth Amendment. The correct Thirteenth Amendment prohibits slavery. Although some people claim that state publication of the erroneous Thirteenth Amendment makes it valid, Article V of the Constitution does not so provide.

In a 2004 case, Sibley v. Culliver, a federal district court found that the defendant's invocation of this amendment worked to his detriment. The court took note of documents produced by the defendant, a convicted murderer who submitted documents in support of his appeal claiming that it rendered his conviction invalid:

These documents allege in great detail a complex conspiracy by an illegal monopoly, the American Bar Association, which resulted in a take-over of the judicial systems of this country, both federal and state, by the ABA and its related entities, including the Alabama State Bar Association and Alabama's Unified Court System. It is then alleged that the ABA-controlled system is illegal and in violation of what is referred to as the "missing Thirteenth Amendment", to the United States Constitution, which stated that any person who accepts a title of nobility forfeits his United States citizenship and which amendment was ratified but subsequently hidden or excised from the law. Since lawyers and judges accept the titles "Esquire"/"The Honorable", it is argued, they are not citizens and the entire judicial system is illegal. Furthermore, these documents contend that the charge of conviction in this case, capital murder of a police officer acting in the line of duty, is unconstitutional because it bestows upon police officers special rights or a special designation of the worth of life in contravention of the "missing Thirteenth Amendment". The documents then explain that these are reasons that Sibley and his wife refused appointed counsel on appeal and refused to pursue matters any further in the court system and that only Congress can give them relief.

The Sibley court dismissed the appeal, concluding in part that the defendant was simply not seeking relief through the courts. Sibley v. Culliver was cited by a court in describing a prison inmate's attempt to use the Titles of Nobility Amendment to claim immunity from jurisdiction:

Some plaintiffs have relied on what they have called the "true" Thirteenth Amendment to argue that various individuals are not citizens. This version of the Thirteenth Amendment allegedly states that individuals who accept titles of nobility must renounce their United States citizenship. ... The Court interprets Belt's claim of a noble title and another nationality as further indications of his attempt to renounce his citizenship and therefore contest the Government's ability to keep him imprisoned.

In a 2001 decision by the Wisconsin Court of Appeals, the court rejected a defendant's attempt to use the Titles of Nobility Amendment to deny the trial court's authority to put him on trial:

[The Defendant] also appears to argue that licensing lawyers violates the original Thirteenth Amendment to the United States Constitution by equating licensure with accepting a title of nobility or honor. The current Thirteenth Amendment does not resemble the one Casteel cites, nor is he correct that a lawyer's license to practice is granted by a foreign power.

In 2021, a number of international media outlets erroneously asserted that the amendment had passed and claimed that it could be used to stop Meghan Markle from running for President, on the grounds that she holds the courtesy noble title of Duchess of Sussex through her husband Prince Harry. However, other outlets correctly stated that the amendment had never been ratified.

== See also ==
- List of amendments to the United States Constitution, amendments sent to the states, both ratified and unratified
- List of Americans who held noble titles from other countries – People who would have or may be affected if the amendment is adopted
- List of proposed amendments to the United States Constitution, amendments proposed in Congress but never sent to the states for ratification
- United States nationality law
