= Rogers v. Bellei =

- Supreme Court of the United States

Argued January 15, 1970 Reargued November 12, 1970 Decided April 5, 1971
- Full case name: William P. Rogers, Secretary of State, Appellant, v. Aldo Mario Bellei
- Citations: 401 U.S. 815 (more) 91 S. Ct. 1060; 28 L. Ed. 2d 499

Case history
- Prior: Appeal from the United States District Court for the District of Columbia

Holding
- Congress has the power to impose the condition subsequent of residence in this country on appellee, who does not come within the Fourteenth Amendment's definition of citizens as those "born or naturalized in the United States," and its imposition is not unreasonable, arbitrary, or unlawful.

Court membership
- Chief Justice Warren E. Burger Associate Justices Hugo Black · William O. Douglas; John M. Harlan II · William J. Brennan Jr. Potter Stewart · Byron White; Thurgood Marshall · Harry Blackmun

Case opinions
- Majority: Blackmun, joined by Burger, Harlan, Stewart, White
- Dissent: Black, joined by Douglas, Marshall
- Dissent: Brennan, joined by Douglas

Rogers v. Bellei, 401 U.S. 815 (1971), was a decision by the United States Supreme Court, which held that an individual who received an automatic congressional grant of citizenship at birth, but who was born outside the United States, may lose his citizenship for failure to fulfill any reasonable residence requirements which the United States Congress may impose as a condition subsequent to that citizenship.

== The case ==
The appellee, Aldo Mario Bellei, was born in Italy to an Italian father and an American mother. He acquired U.S. citizenship by virtue of section 1993 of the Revised Statutes of 1874, which conferred citizenship upon any child born outside the United States of only one American parent (known as jus sanguinis). Bellei received several warnings from government officials that failure to fulfill the five-year residency requirement before age 28 could result in loss of his U.S. citizenship. In 1964, he received a letter informing him that his citizenship had been revoked under § 301(b) of the Immigration and Nationality Act of 1952.

Bellei challenged the constitutionality of this act. The three-judge District Court held the section unconstitutional, citing Afroyim v. Rusk, and Schneider v. Rusk.

The Supreme Court reversed the decision, ruling against Bellei.

== Later ==
The statute under which Bellei was stripped of his citizenship was repealed by the U.S. Congress in 1978.

== See also ==
- List of United States Supreme Court cases, volume 401
- Afroyim v. Rusk, 387 U.S. 253 (1967)
