= United States nationality law =

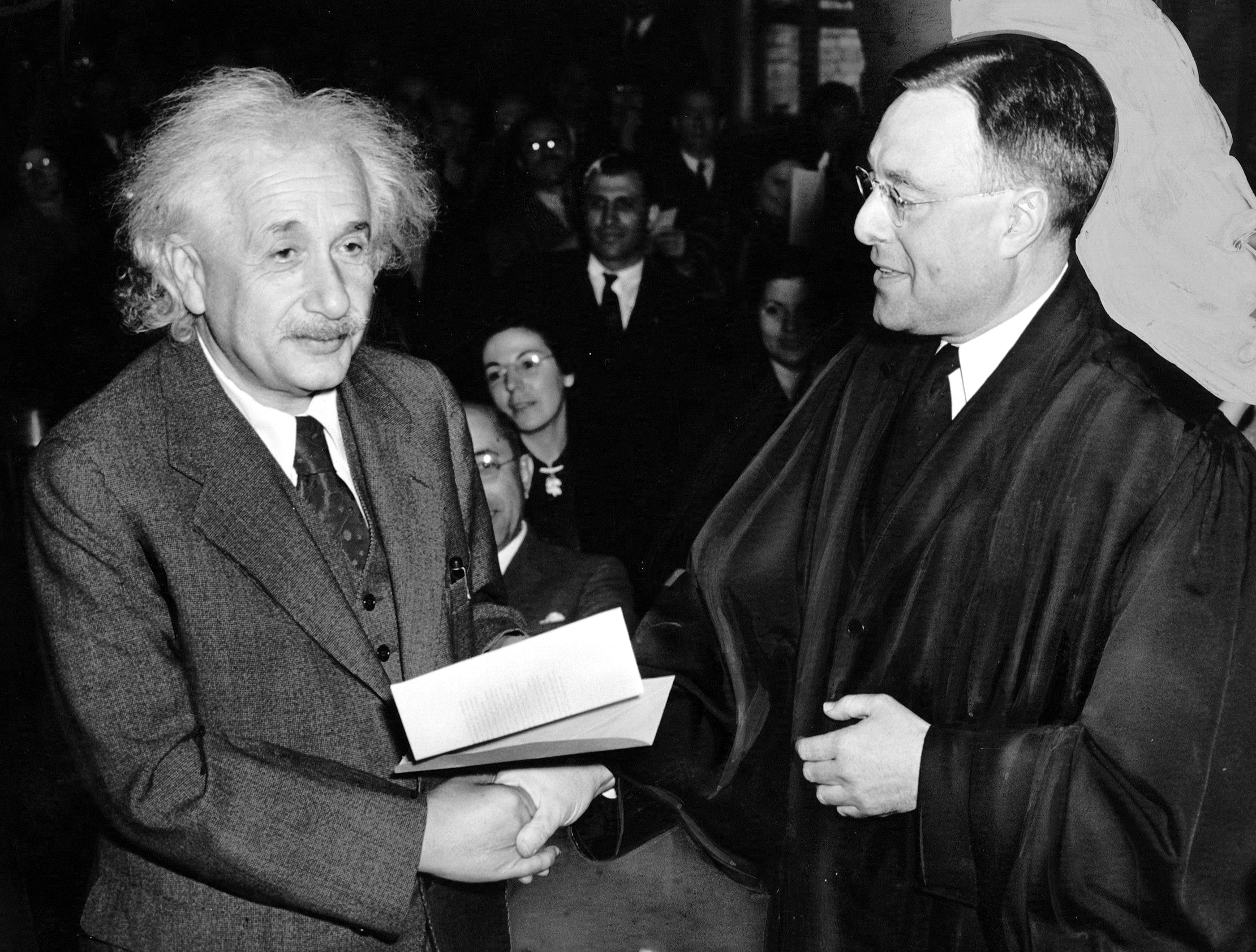
Physicist Albert Einstein receiving his Certificate of Naturalization from Judge Phillip Forman in 1940

United States nationality law details the conditions in which a person holds United States nationality. In the United States, nationality is typically obtained through provisions in the U.S. Constitution, various laws, and international agreements. Citizenship is established as a right under the Constitution, not as a privilege, for those born or naturalized in the United States under its jurisdiction. While the words citizen and national are sometimes used interchangeably, national is a broader legal term, such that a person can be a national but not a citizen, while citizen is reserved to nationals who have the status of citizenship.

Individuals born in any of the fifty U.S. states, the District of Columbia or almost any inhabited territory are United States citizens (and nationals) by birthright. The sole exception is American Samoa, where individuals are typically non-citizen U.S. nationals at birth. Additionally, individuals born from foreign diplomats working in the United States are neither citizens nor nationals. Foreign nationals living in any state or qualified territory may naturalize after going through the legal process of qualifying as permanent residents and meeting a residence requirement (normally five years).

== History ==
=== Constitutional foundation ===
Article 1, section 8, clause 4 of the U.S. Constitution, or the Naturalization Clause, gives Congress the authority to establish a "uniform Rule of Naturalization". Before the American Civil War and adoption of the Fourteenth Amendment, the Constitution mentioned nationality mainly with respect to eligibility for federal office, such as through requiring the president of the United States be a natural-born-citizen, or the jurisdiction of the federal courts, such as through providing federal jurisdiction over admiralty and maritime cases. In the earliest Supreme Court case dealing with nationality, Talbot v. Jansen (1795), the court held that a United States citizen could have dual citizenship. Later, in United States v. Wong Kim Ark (1898), the Supreme Court held that the Fourteenth Amendment conferred citizenship to all persons born in the United States, and in Trump v. Barbara (2026), the court held that this includes the children of persons unlawfully or temporarily present, with limited exceptions.

=== Nationality laws (1790–1866) ===
The first statute to define nationality and naturalization in the United States was the Naturalization Act of 1790. It limited those who were eligible to be nationals as free, white persons. Following the practices of English common law, the legal system of the United States absorbed coverture, or the assumption that a woman's loyalty and obligations to her spouse were more important than her loyalty and obligation to the nation. While the Nationality Act did not forbid a woman to have her own nationality, judicial rulings and custom on domestic matters established that infants, slaves, and women were unable to participate in public life, as a result of the belief that they lacked critical judgment and had no right to exercise free will or control property. Native Americans were considered to be subjects of foreign governments and per decisions like Dred Scott v. Sandford (60 U.S. (19 How.) 393, 1857) were only eligible to become naturalized if they assimilated white culture. From 1802, only fathers were able to pass on their nationality to their children. The Naturalization Act of 1804 confirmed that a woman's nationality was dependent upon her marital status and the Naturalization Act of 1855 tied a wife's nationality, and that of her children, to her husband's. A wife who married a foreign husband in this period was assumed to have suspended her nationality in favor of his. She was able to repatriate upon termination of the marriage and resumption of residence in the United States. While the 1855 Act specified that foreign wives gained U.S. nationality, the law created confusion as to whether it required American women who married aliens to take the nationality of the spouse. For example, Nellie Grant, daughter of President Ulysses S. Grant, reacquired her U.S. nationality in 1898 by an Act of Congress, after a divorce from a British husband.

=== Expansions (1866–1900) ===
In the aftermath of the Civil War, Congress enacted the Civil Rights Act of 1866 and later that year passed the Fourteenth Amendment to the United States Constitution to grant citizenship status to former slaves. The language of the Amendment was race-neutral and granted nationality to anyone born in the United States and subject to their jurisdiction. (Note: Because the status of the parents was irrelevant, except if they were in the employ as part of the military or diplomatic corps of a foreign government or Native American, U.S.-born women could pass on their nationality to their children born in the United States, as could parents who themselves were part of a restricted group. For example, the Supreme Court ruled in United States v. Wong Kim Ark (169 U.S. 649, 1898) that children born in the United States to immigrants not eligible for naturalization were birthright citizens.) It did not extend nationality to Native Americans. In Elk v. Wilkins (112 U.S. 94, 1884) the Supreme Court confirmed that those Native Americans who were born subject to tribal jurisdiction did not have birthright nationality in United States territory.

=== Restrictions (1900–1965) ===
Under the Insular Cases of 1901, the Supreme Court ruled that unincorporated territories and insular possessions of the United States, which were not on a path toward statehood, had limited applicability of the U.S. Constitution. At the time, these included Guam, the Philippines, and Puerto Rico, acquired in 1898 at the end of the Spanish–American War. According to the decision, those born in insular possessions or unincorporated territories were not eligible for citizenship, though they were considered nationals and could hold a U.S. passport and gain diplomatic protection from the United States. Passage of the Expatriation Act of 1907 eliminated the uncertainty created in 1855, definitively stating that marriage solely determined all women's nationality. The law immediately revoked the nationality of married women, regardless of whether they were born in the United States or naturalized, if they were married to a non-citizen. It was retroactive and did not require a wife's consent, leaving many women unaware that they had lost their nationality.

The federal Immigration Acts of 1921 and 1924 were passed by Congress to address the concern that white authority was declining. The 1921 Act, known as the Emergency Quota Act, restricted immigration from various countries. The limits applied to foreign husbands and children of U.S.-born women, but provided an exemption for foreign wives and children of birthright male nationals. In 1922, the Cable Act was passed, declaring that an American woman could not be denied the right to naturalize because she was married. It established procedures for women, who had previously lost their citizenship because of marriage, to repatriate as naturalized (not birthright) citizens. A wife's nationality depended on residence and her husband's eligibility to naturalize; if she lived abroad, her nationality on re-entry to U.S. territory was therefore subject to the restrictions of the Quota Act. However, because the Cable Act was worded to specifically state that "women citizens" who married ineligible foreigners lost their nationality, it did not apply to American Samoan women, as they were non-citizen nationals.

Under the terms of the 1924 act, also known as the Johnson-Reed Act, Asians were not allowed to enter the country and were excluded from naturalization. It stated that an American-born woman whose nationality was lost because of marriage, regardless of whether that marriage had terminated, was ineligible for naturalization and was considered to have been "born in the country of which [they were] a citizen or subject". The Supreme Court ruling of 1923, in United States v. Bhagat Singh Thind, retroactively removed the nationality of Asian men, automatically revoking their wives' nationality. If a U.S. woman married to a man of Asian descent left the country, she could not be readmitted to the United States. Husbands could petition for an exception allowing their foreign-born wives to lawfully immigrate, but wives were unable to petition for their husbands. Immediately after passage of the 1924 Act, the Department of Labor Secretary, James Davis, recommended extending its provisions to immigrants from Mexico and other countries in the Americas. Every year from 1926 to 1930, Congress considered bills evaluating imposing quotas for immigration from the other nations in the western hemisphere. In June 1924, the Indian Citizenship Act granted Native Americans, unilaterally, nationality in the United States.

In 1933, the United States delegation to the Pan-American Union's Montevideo conference, Alexander W. Weddell and Joshua Butler Wright signed the Inter-American Convention on the Nationality of Women, which became effective in 1934, legally reserving limitations for domestic legislative review. The Equal Nationality Act of 1934 was the first statute that allowed derivative nationality for children born abroad to pass from their mother. Their nationality was dependent on whether the mother had resided in the United States before the child was born. As the law was not retroactive, children born before 1934 were typically prevented from deriving citizenship from their mother. The statute also provided preferential naturalization for any foreign spouse married to a U.S. national. It stated that eligible foreigners, who met all other requirements of naturalization, could naturalize under reduced requirements forgoing a declaration of intent and needing only three years of continuous residency within the United States, Alaska, Hawaii, or Puerto Rico.

Amendments to the Cable Act and nationality laws continued until 1940, when married women were granted their own nationality without restriction. That year, Congress amended the Nationality Act, distinguishing for the first time different rules for derivative nationality for legitimate and illegitimate children. Under the provisions, children born out of wedlock passed from mother to child automatically, but required legitimization of paternity prior to a child reaching the age of majority for derivative nationality from the father. The 1940 Act also allowed all women who had previously lost their citizenship because of marriage to repatriate without regard to their marital status, by swearing the oath of allegiance, as opposed to the previous policy of repatriation by naturalization. Racial exclusions for derivative naturalization of husbands of U.S.-citizen wives remained in place until passage of the McCarran-Walter Act in 1952. Though it ended utilizing race as a criterion for admission to the country of nationalization, continued use of quotas to restrict immigration from Asian countries did not end racial exclusion. Until immigration laws were reformed by the Immigration and Nationality Act of 1965, the restrictive quota system remained in place.

=== Refinements (1966–2001) ===
Until 1972, the Nationality Laws of the United States required that children born abroad to U.S. nationals complete a five-year residency by establishing a continuous domicile in the territory prior to their twenty-third birthday. Failure to establish a residence nullified U.S. nationality and citizenship. In 1982, Congress enacted provisions for children born between 1950 and 1982 to facilitate immigration for children of U.S. national fathers. Intended to assist children born in areas where the U.S. had been militarily active, it applied to children born in Kampuchea, Korea, Laos, Thailand and Vietnam. The special provisions did not give children nationality, but loosened the requirements for legitimization and financial support for children born abroad, removed scrutiny of the father's marital status, requiring only that the Attorney General establish that a presumed father was a citizen and that a sponsor agreed to take legal custody and support a child under the age of eighteen. In 1987, the Amerasian Homecoming Act facilitated resettlement of immigrant Vietnamese mothers and their children born between 1962 and 1972 to U.S. military personnel.

In 1989, a ruling in the case of Elias v. United States Department of State (721 F. Supp. 243, N.C. Cal 1989) confirmed that a child born abroad prior to 1934 to a U.S.-born woman could obtain derivative nationality. As the case was not a class-action lawsuit, it did not impact others in similar situations; however, the 1993 ruling in Wauchope v. United States Department of State (985 F.2d 1407, 9th Cir. 1993) by the 9th Circuit Court of Appeals declared section 1993, which denied a woman's ability to transmit nationality to her children born before 1934, unconstitutional. In the case Miller v. Albright (523 U.S. 420 1998), the court upheld discriminatory regulations set out in Title 8 U.S.C. § 1409 in the treatment of women and men passing their nationality to illegitimate children. Justice John Paul Stevens' opinion in the case was that men do not establish a legal tie to a child except by choice; whereas, a woman's legal tie is established by biology. In essence, a woman's tie with her child is legal when birth occurs and cannot be severed without legally terminating her parental rights, but a man can choose to walk away or establish a tie. The ruling meant that mothers were able to pass on their nationality at the birth of an illegitimate child born abroad, if the mother had lived for a continuous period of one year prior to the child's birth in the United States or a U.S. territory. For an unmarried man to pass nationality to an illegitimate child born abroad, before the child's eighteenth birthday, a blood relationship must be proved in court, the child must be recognized and legitimized, and the father's nationality at the time of birth must be confirmed. On the basis of Clark v. Jeter (486 U.S. 456, 1988), no similar requirement applies for a married man. However, for both married men and unmarried men, the statute "required the U.S.-born parent to have ten years' physical presence in the United States prior to the child's birth, 'at least five of which were after attaining' age 14". In 2001, the Supreme Court again upheld the unequal regulations in the case of Nguyen v. INS (533 U.S. 53 2001) confirming that in the case of nationality, the inequality is present, which serves governmental objectives, to establish both a biological tie and a customary relationship between the child and parent.

=== U.S. outlying territorial history ===
The Territorial Clause of the Constitution gave Congress authority to regulate on behalf of United States territories and possessions. Using that power, Congress made distinctions for those territories which were to be incorporated eventually as states, and those that were not on a path of statehood. Because of this authority, Congress has determined when inhabitants can become nationals and what their status is at any given time. Prior to 1898, all persons born in U.S. possessions were treated as having been born in the United States, and upon acquisition, provisions were made for collective naturalization. After that date, possessions have been selectively judged to foreign localities and not subject to the Citizenship Clause of the Fourteenth Amendment. Because of that determination, all persons in the U.S. outlying possessions were considered U.S. nationals, non-citizens, until Congress chose to convey full rights of citizenship. This included inhabitants of American Samoa, Guam, the Philippines, Puerto Rico, and the Virgin Islands. Non-citizen nationals do not have full protection of their rights, though they may reside in the United States and gain entry without a visa. Likewise, territorial citizens do not have the ability for full participation in national politics.

In a series of Acts, the United States conveyed nationality upon outlying territories not destined for statehood. Inhabitants became neither aliens, eligible for naturalization, nor citizens with full rights. In 1900, legislation defined inhabitants in Puerto Rico as both citizens of Puerto Rico and U.S. nationals. In 1902, similar legislation to that passed for Puerto Rico came in to force concerning the Philippines. The United States established special rules for people working in the Panama Canal Zone in 1903, under the terms of the Panamanian-U.S. Canal Convention. Under its provisions, the 8 U.S.C. § 1403 was modified to include language that persons born in the Canal Zone or in Panama itself, on or after February 26, 1904, to a parent who was, or formerly was, a United States national derived U.S. birthright citizenship. In 1906, Congress passed legislation to allow persons born in unincorporated territories to be naturalized, under special provisions.

The Jones–Shafroth Act of 1917, conferred nationality with citizenship rights upon all inhabitants of Puerto Rico, regardless of when their birth occurred in the territory. In 1927, U.S. nationals of the U.S. Virgin Islands were granted citizenship rights. American Samoa became a U.S. territory in 1929 and its inhabitants became non-citizen nationals. Since passage of the Nationality Act of 1940, non-citizen nationals may transmit their non-citizen U.S. nationality to children born abroad. The Philippine Independence Act became effective in 1946, and thereafter, Filipinos did not have U.S. nationality. The residents of the Trust Territory of the Pacific Islands came under U.S. jurisdiction in 1947, pursuant to an arrangement with the United Nations, but it was not included as a territory at that time. U.S. nationals of Guam, by the Organic Act of 1950, were conferred the rights of citizenship. In 1976, the Trust Territories became the Commonwealth of the Northern Mariana Islands, were admitted as a territory, and inhabitants were conferred U.S. nationality with the rights of citizens. Co-administration of Panama and the Canal Zone commenced on October 1, 1979, and thereafter, U.S. nationality could not be acquired.

== Acquisition and loss of nationality ==
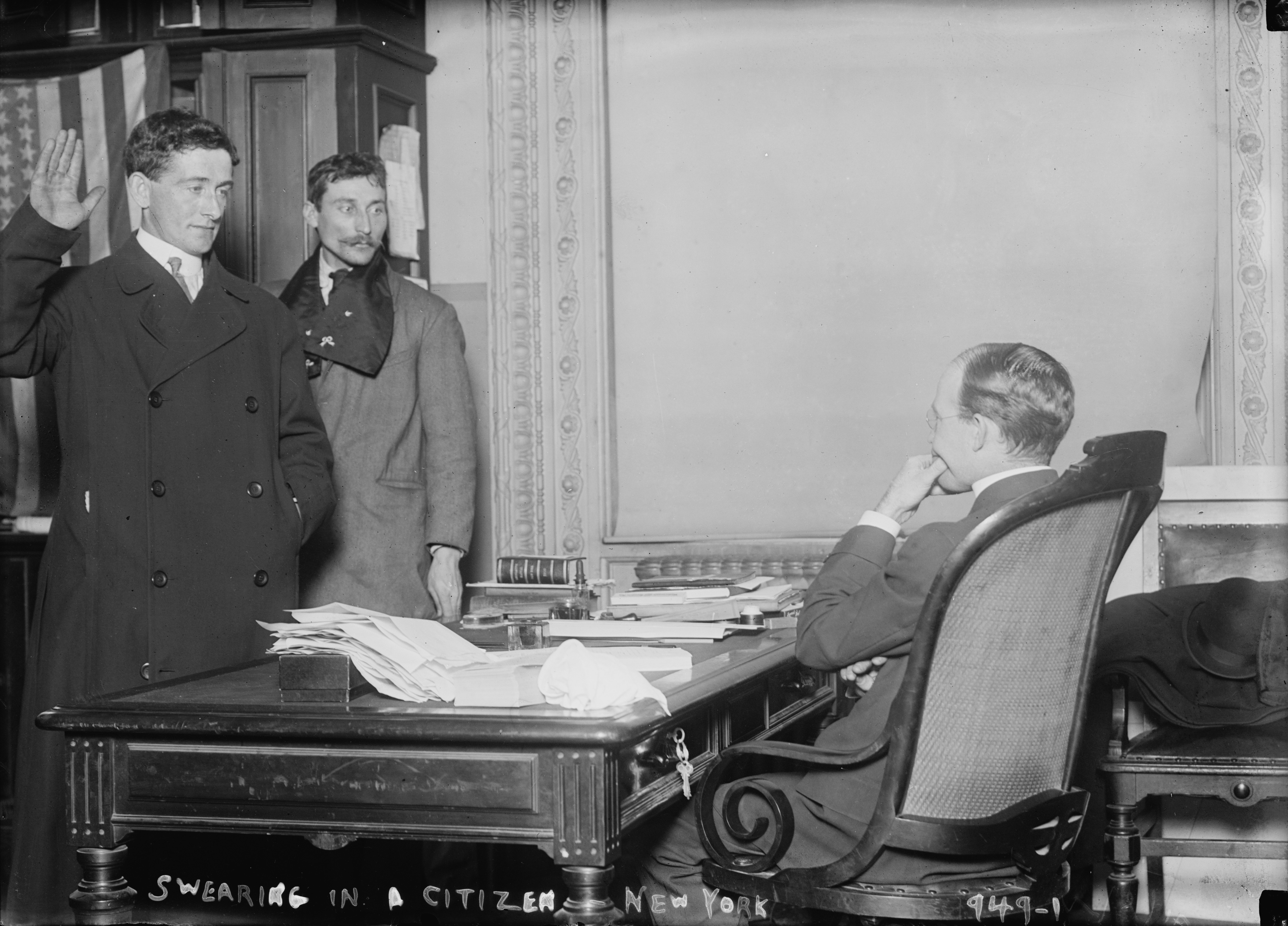
A judge swears in a new citizen. New York, 1910

There are various ways a person can acquire United States nationality, either at birth by naturalization or through court decisions and treaties.

=== Birth within the United States ===
Section 1 of the Fourteenth Amendment provides that "All persons born or naturalized in the United States, and subject to the jurisdiction thereof, are citizens of the United States and of the State wherein they reside." The language has been codified in the Immigration and Nationality Act of 1952, section 301(a). Regardless of the status of the parent, unless they are in the employ of a foreign government, birth within the territory confers nationality. The Supreme Court explicitly ruled in the case Trump v. Barbara, decided June 30, 2026, that "Children born in the United States to parents unlawfully or temporarily present are 'subject to the jurisdiction' of the United States and are citizens at birth under the Fourteenth Amendment’s Citizenship Clause". This ruling upholds the established legal consensus and overturns executive order 14160 signed by President Donald Trump on the first day of his second term (90 FR 8449). Birth certificates from U.S. jurisdictions are typically acceptable proof of nationality.

=== Through birth abroad to United States citizens ===
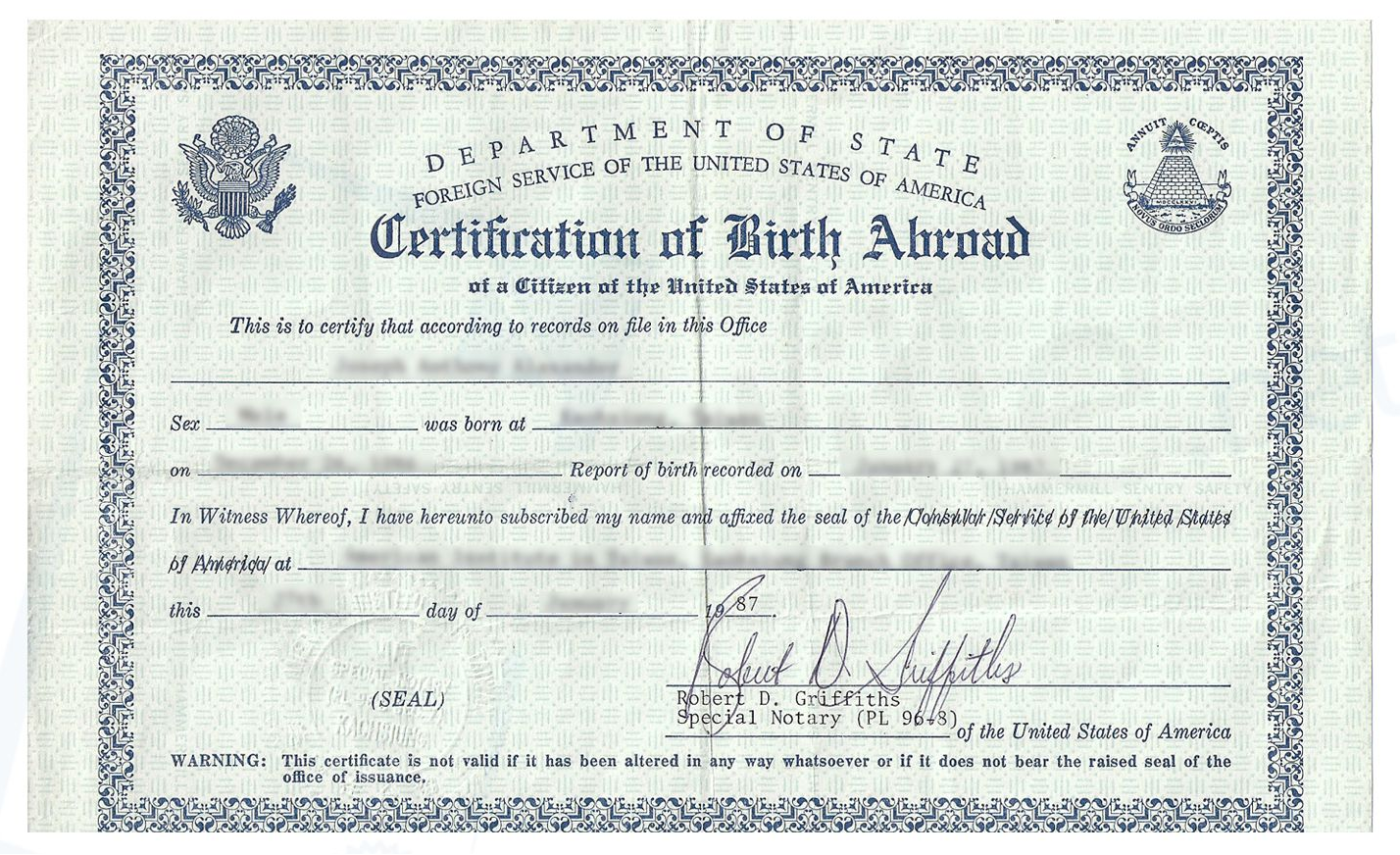
A State Department certification of birth abroad, issued prior to 1990

For children born abroad, a Consular Report of Birth Abroad may be requested to certify the acquisition of US citizenship at birth. Section 301(c) of the INA extends at birth to children born abroad to two parents who are married U.S. citizens, as long as one of the parents has resided in the US for any length of time. If one parent is a non-citizen national, Section 301(d) requires one year of continuous residence in the United States for the US citizen parent. Section 301(g) establishes that to attain automatic nationality for a child born abroad to a citizen and a foreign national, residency in the United States or its possessions is required. Time served as active military service was considered equivalent to residence in the U.S. For children born out of wedlock, requirements vary, depending on when they were born and the gender of the US citizen parent. Even for two US citizen parents, there are additional requirements if the child is born out of wedlock.

==== Legitimate children ====
Automatic nationality is extended based upon the law applicable at the time of the child's birth:

- If a birth abroad occurred after May 24, 1934, but prior to December 23, 1952, the U.S. national parent must have resided in the United States or its possessions for ten years, with five of them after the age of fourteen.
- If a birth abroad occurred after December 24, 1952, but prior to November 13, 1986, the U.S. national parent must have been the legal and genetic or gestational parent, and have resided in the United States or its possessions for ten years, with five of them after the age of fourteen.
- If the birth occurred on or after November 14, 1986, the U.S. national must have resided in the United States for five years, two of them after the age of fourteen, previous to the birth of the child.

==== Illegitimate children ====
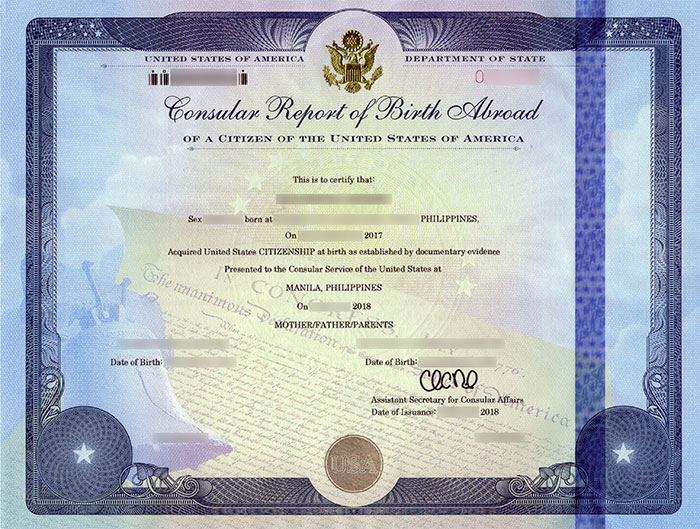
A State Department consular report of birth abroad, issued beginning 2011

Automatic nationality is extended based upon the law applicable at the time of the child's birth:

- Effective 90 days after October 14, 1940 (whether born before or after this date), if the birth occurred to a U.S. mother who had at any time resided in the United States or its possessions, or to a U.S. father who had legitimized the child during its minority and who had resided in the United States or its possessions for ten years, with five of them after the age of sixteen, as long as the child resided in the United States for five years prior to the age of majority.
- If the birth occurred between January 13, 1941, and December 23, 1952, to a U.S. mother who had at any time resided in the United States or its possessions, or to a U.S. father who had legitimized the child during its minority and who had resided in the United States or its possessions for ten years, with five of them after the age of sixteen.
- If the child was born between December 24, 1952, and November 13, 1986, to a U.S. mother who had resided in the United States or its possessions for one year, or to a U.S. father who had legitimized the child during its minority and who had resided in the United States or its possessions for ten years, with five of them after the age of fourteen.
- If the child was born between November 14, 1986, and June 11, 2017, to a U.S. mother who had resided in the United States or its possessions for one year, or to a U.S. father who had resided in the United States or its possessions five years before the child's birth, with two of them after the age of fourteen. In 2017, in a unanimous decision in the case of Sessions v. Morales-Santana (137 S. Ct. 1678, 2017), the Supreme Court struck down the unequal gender-based residence requirement for unmarried fathers to pass on nationality to their children born abroad, ruling that the equal but longer term of five years residency should apply to both fathers and mothers until Congress amended the law. In cases where both the mother and father are U.S. citizens, either the pre- or post-Sessions v. Morales-Santana physical presence requirements may apply to U.S. mothers, as the Supreme Court case did not address this specific situation, which falls under a different section of the law. For any child born after November 14, 1986, to a non-US citizen mother and a US citizen the father, the father has to 1) agree to financially support the child, and before the child reaches 18 years of age 2.A) prove in court a biological relationship, or 2.B) formally legitimize the child, or 2.C) officially confirm in a signed and sworn statement the paternity of the child.".

=== Adoptions ===
Prior to 2000, adoptees had to be naturalized and could be subject to deportation in later life for various offenses. Adopted children born on or before February 26, 1983, are subject to the law in effect at the time they were adopted. With passage of the Child Citizenship Act of 2000, effective for children under eighteen or born on or after February 27, 2001, foreign adoptees of U.S. nationals, brought to the United States by a legal custodial parent in their minority, automatically derive nationality upon legal entry to the country and finalization of the adoption process.

=== Birth in outlying possessions ===
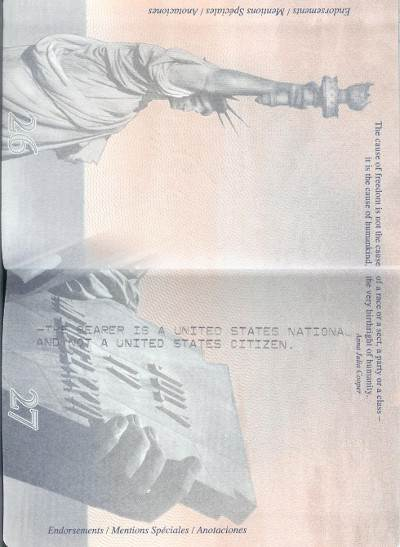
Message in the passport of an American Samoan stating that the passport holder is a national, not citizen, of the U.S

For people born in U.S. territories or possessions, nationality hinges upon whether they were born prior to the area being covered by U.S. sovereignty, during a period of U.S. sovereignty, or after U.S. sovereignty was terminated. Separate sections of the Nationality Act of 1952 handle territories that the United States has acquired over time, such as Alaska 8 U.S.C. § 1404 and Hawaii 8 U.S.C. § 1405, both incorporated, and unincorporated Puerto Rico 8 U.S.C. § 1402, the U.S. Virgin Islands 8 U.S.C. § 1406, and Guam 8 U.S.C. § 1407. Each of these sections confer nationality on persons living in these territories as of a certain date, and usually confer native-born status on persons born in incorporated territories after that date. Specified effective dates in the territories include April 11, 1899, for Guam and Puerto Rico; January 17, 1917, for the U.S. Virgin Islands; and November 4, 1986, for the Commonwealth of the Northern Mariana Islands. Since passage of the Nationality Act of 1952, people born in these territories acquire nationality at birth.

Congress has conferred birthright citizenship, through legislation, to persons born in all inhabited territories except American Samoa and Swains Island, who are granted the status of non-citizen-nationals. A December 12, 2019, ruling by U.S. District Judge Clark Waddoups struck down the special status 8 U.S.C. § 1408(1) of American Samoans as non-citizen nationals as unconstitutional, holding that "any State Department policy that provides that the citizenship provisions of the Constitution do not apply to persons born in American Samoa violates the 14th Amendment." Government attorneys had argued that "Such a novel holding would be contrary to the decisions of every court of appeals to have considered the question, inconsistent with over a century of historical practice by all three branches of the United States government, and conflict with the strong objection of the local government of American Samoa." Waddoups stayed his ruling on December 13 pending appellate review, so it did not take immediate effect. On June 15, 2021, the United States Court of Appeals for the Tenth Circuit reversed the ruling.

=== Naturalization ===
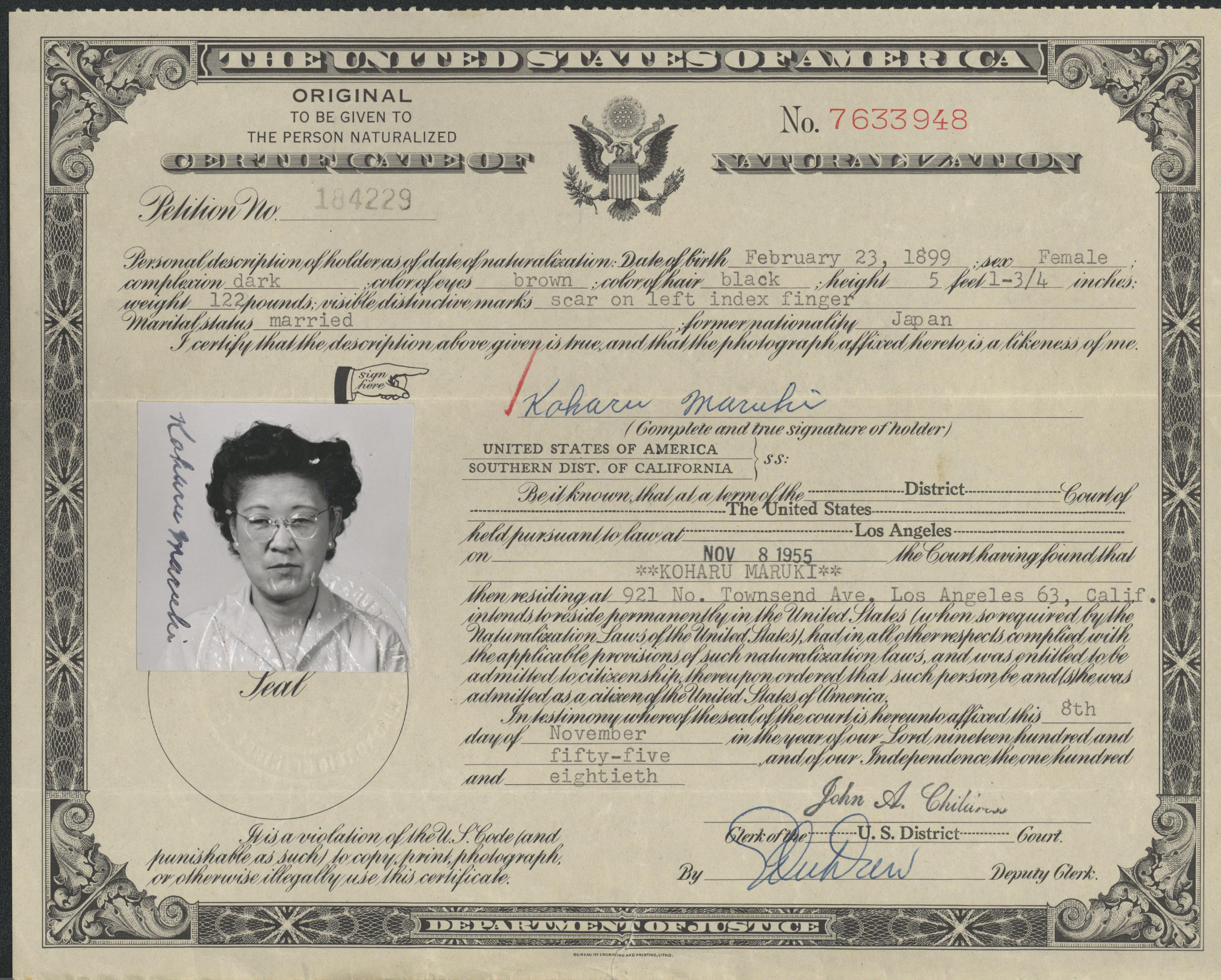
A certificate of naturalization (1955)

A person who was not born a United States national may acquire U.S. nationality through a process known as naturalization.

==== Eligibility for naturalization ====
To become naturalized in the United States, an applicant must be at least eighteen years of age at the time of filing, a legal permanent resident of the United States, and have had a status of a legal permanent resident in the United States for five years before applying. A minimum physical presence in the territory for two and a half years is required, and absences of over six months reset the time frame. Persons married to and living with a U.S. national are eligible for a reduced residency period of three years with half of it requiring physical presence. For the period immediately preceding application, persons must have three months residence established in the jurisdiction in which they are filing and must remain continuously in residence until completion of the granting of nationality. Non-citizen nationals of U.S. possessions are eligible for naturalization upon establishing residency in a state. The territory of the United States, for the purposes of determining a person's period of residence, includes the fifty states, the District of Columbia, Puerto Rico, the U.S. Virgin Islands, Guam, and the Northern Mariana Islands, specifically excluding residence in American Samoa, except for American Samoans seeking naturalization.

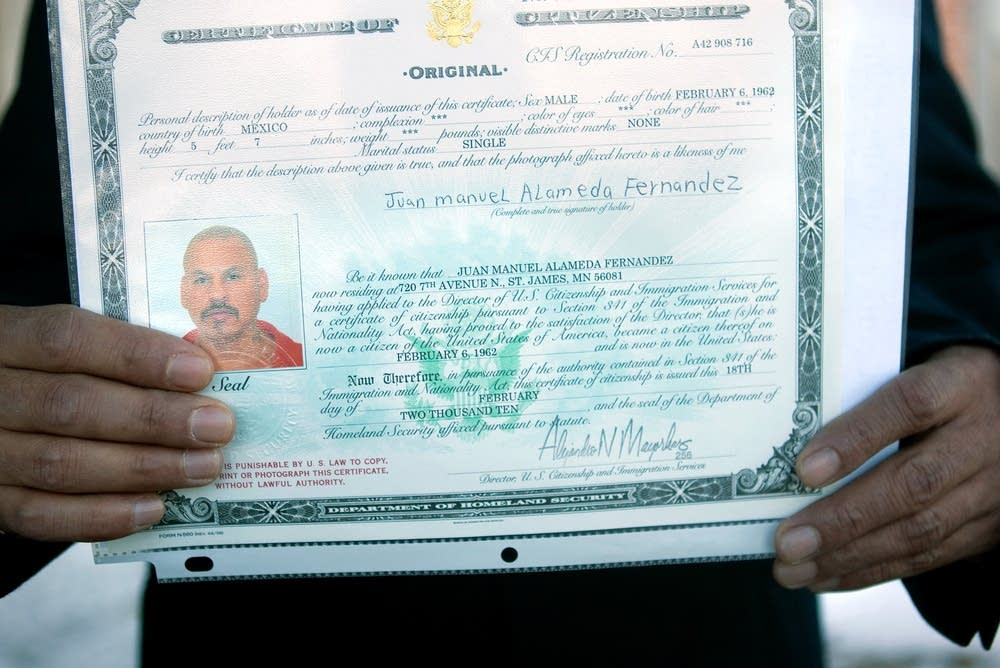
A person holding up his certificate of derivative citizenship (2010)

Some exemptions from permanent residency exist for certain qualifying naturalization applicants. For example, since 1940, an immigrant who honorably served in the U.S. military during a designated period of hostility may naturalize without having first been a permanent resident. During peace time, a foreigner's honorable military service reduces the residency requirement to one year. A legal but not permanent immigrant who successfully completed the Military Accessions Vital to National Interest program may naturalize without first having been a permanent resident. (Note: Though bills have been introduced, neither the Deferred Action for Childhood Arrivals nor DREAM Act allow unauthorized immigrants who were brought to the United States as children to enlist in the military as a pathway to naturalization. Enlistment requires verification of immigration status.) Similarly, an immigrant who has made extraordinary contributions, such as scientists or Olympic athletes, can be exempted from residency as well as the physical presence requirement and prohibitions for support of totalitarianism and or communism.

The Child Citizenship Act of 2000 provided that a minor child born abroad to a U.S.-national parent who had not satisfied the residency requirements for nationality at birth could qualify for special naturalization. In lieu of the parent, a child may also qualify under this process if the child's grandparent has satisfied the five-year residency in the United States with two of those years occurring after the child reached the age of 14. Eligible children are not required to meet any other requirements for naturalization.

==== Process for naturalization ====
Questions and answers for the civics portion of the citizenship test. (Full text available here)

Applicants must apply for naturalization with the United States Citizenship and Immigration Services and pay requisite fees. They must demonstrate good moral character, evidenced by a lack of a criminal history, and must pass a test on United States history and civics. The questions are publicly available on the web and require the applicant to answer ten out of one hundred possible questions. Most applicants must also have a working knowledge of the English language, demonstrated by testing their basic ability in reading and writing, rather than fluency. Long-term permanent residents are exempt from the language test. For example, a person who is over age fifty with twenty years of residency or over fifty-five with fifteen years of residency can opt to take the civics test in their original language. Persons over age sixty-five with twenty years residency may be given a shorter list of questions and those with physical or mental disadvantages are exempt from either the language or civics examinations. Granting of nationality is contingent upon taking an Oath of Allegiance; however since 2000 an exception has been made for people with diminished physical or mental capacity.

=== Relinquishment and deprivation ===
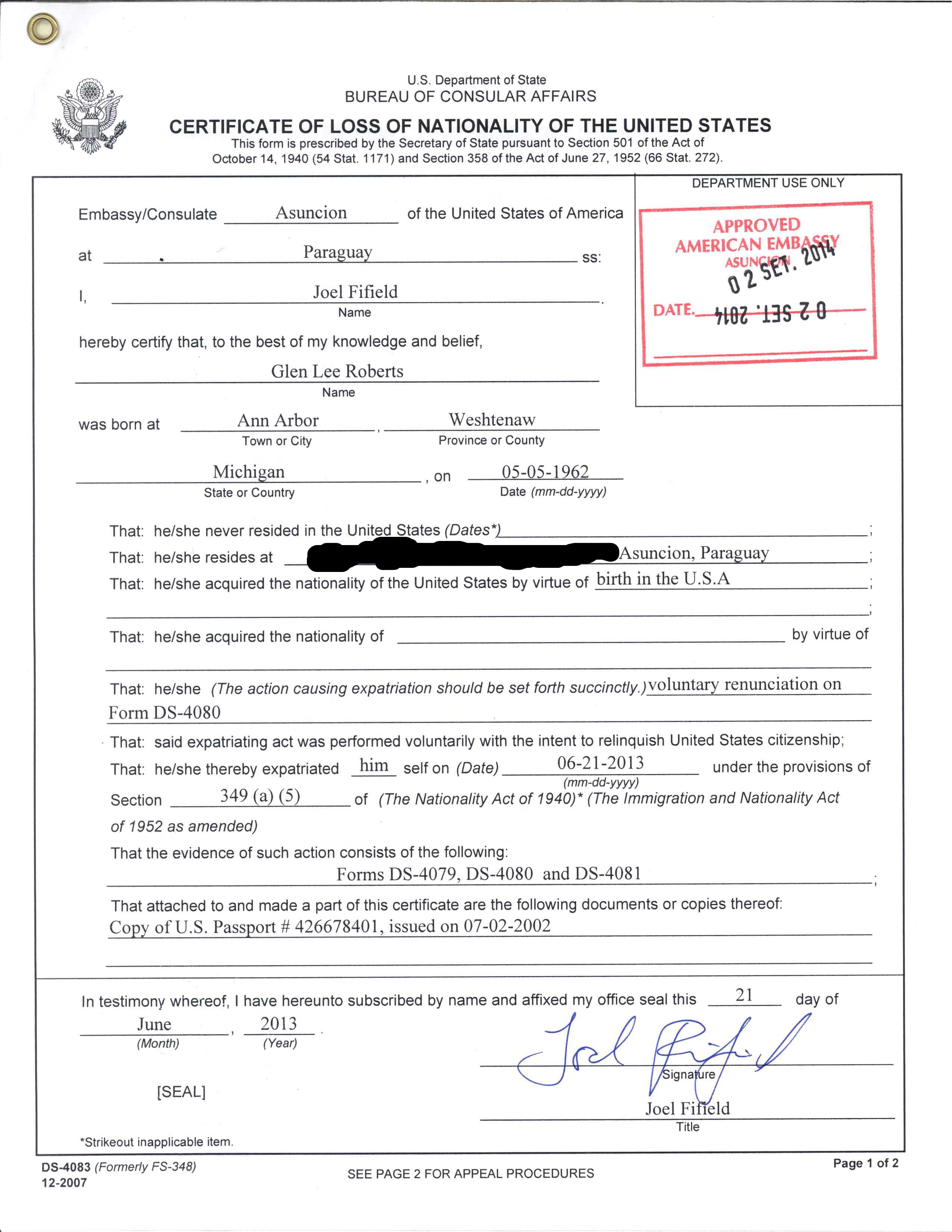
A Certificate of Loss of Nationality, signifying that the bearer has relinquished or renounced U.S. nationality

The United States has a lengthy history of involuntary expatriation (loss of nationality). From 1907, naturalized persons who returned to their country of origin for two or more years could be expatriated, as could native-born nationals who moved abroad and took allegiance to another nation. Married women were automatically expatriated upon marriage to foreign men or men who were unable to qualify for naturalization. From 1940, reasons for involuntary termination of nationality included service to a foreign government or in foreign armed forces, voting in a foreign election, military desertion, treason, or evidence of dual nationality, except for possession of a passport. The Supreme Court's interpretation of expatriation was made clear in Mackenzie v. Hare in 1915 with the ruling that Ethel Mackenzie's conduct, choosing to marry a non-national, was a voluntary acceptance to be denationalized. In the case of Savorgnan v. United States in 1950, the Court ruled that not knowing the consequences of one's actions was equally voluntary expatriation. The 1958 decision in Perez v. Brownell, which upheld denaturalization for foreign voting, marked a turning point, and the decision was reversed in 1967 in the ruling for Afroyim v. Rusk, 387 U.S. 253, which found that for a person's voluntary action to initiate a loss of nationality, an inference of abandonment by the action must have been present. By 1978, the decision in Vance v. Terrazas made it clear that a specific intent to expatriate must exist to lose nationality.

In 1986, 8 U.S.C. § 1481(a) was amended based on these court decisions to affirm that the intention to relinquish nationality must exist when performing a voluntary act for loss of nationality to occur. The State Department issued a partial list of actions such as paying taxes or recording a will in the United States, which would indicate intent to retain a national identity, or using a foreign passport when entering the United States or registering with a foreign political party, which might indicate an intent to relinquish nationality, but advised each case was to be reviewed in context. Nationals were advised to write a statement advising that their actions were not an intent to give up their nationality and file it with an embassy or consulate official. In 1990, Section 1481 was revised again, to reflect a new policy of the State Department to presume that an individual did not intend to give up nationality, if the person performed a potentially expatriating act. Based on a consular memorandum, this meant that, for example, acquisition of nationality in another nation which included a routine declaration of allegiance, or accepting foreign employment in a non-policy position of another nation, should result in the assumption that the person had no intention of relinquishing their nationality through their actions. From that time, the United States effectively has allowed nationals to acquire new nationality while remaining a U.S. national, thereby holding multiple nationalities, and has ceased seeking records of newly nationalized persons abroad to evaluate their potential denationalization.

Removing these items from the potential means of forfeiting U.S. nationality, the Nationality Act retained as possible causes of denaturalization, treason, sedition, or conspiring against the United States; employment as an official with policy-making authority of a foreign government; and voluntary renunciation. Fraud, committed in conjunction with an application for naturalization can also make nationality voidable. Typically, prominent former Nazi officers who acquired U.S. nationality have had it revoked if the Office of Special Investigations has been able to prove that the naturalization was obtained by concealing their involvement in war crimes committed during World War II. They cannot be tried for crimes committed elsewhere, thus are denaturalized for immigration violations, and once they become aliens, ordered deported.

The process of denaturalization is a legal procedure which results in nullifying nationality. Based upon the 1943 Supreme Court decision of Schneiderman v. United States, clear and convincing evidence must be evaluated in processing a denaturalization action. United States Attorneys for the district in which a defendant resides bring suit in the jurisdiction's Federal District Court. Juries are typically not present and the defendant may be compelled to testify. Failure to testify may result in a presumption of guilt, though defendants can plead against self-incrimination. The standard of proof is not reasonable doubt, but rather clear, convincing, and unequivocal evidence. Decisions may be appealed in federal appellate courts and the Supreme Court. Once the legal process has concluded, the Department of State issues a Certificate of Loss of Nationality.

Renunciation of nationality, or legal expatriation, includes the voluntary relinquishment of a national identity and all rights and privileges associated with it. It is accomplished by making a formal declaration, which is sworn before a designated authority in the United States during a time of war, or abroad at any time to a consular officer. Evidence which clearly establishes the intent to expatriate must be approved and if there is doubt, such as in the case where a declarant would become stateless, the Department of State may be reluctant to accept the declaration. After an interview and counseling on the consequences of renunciation, if the applicant wishes to proceed, a fee is paid, the declaration is made, and a renunciation ceremony, in which the applicant signs a Statement of Understanding and takes the Oath of Renunciation, is held.

People giving up U.S. nationality may be subject to an expatriation tax. Originally, under the Foreign Investors Tax Act of 1966, people determined to be giving up their nationality for the purpose of avoiding U.S. taxation were subject to ten years of continued taxation on their U.S.-source income, to prevent ex-nationals from taking advantage of special tax incentives offered to foreigners investing in the United States. Since 2008, these provisions no longer apply; instead, ex-citizens who meet certain asset or tax liability thresholds pay a capital gains tax on a deemed sale of their U.S. and non-U.S. assets, including retirement accounts, regardless of their reasons for giving up citizenship. The Reed Amendment, a 1996 law, bars former nationals as inadmissible to the United States if the Attorney General finds that they renounced citizenship for purposes of avoiding taxes; however, it has never been enforced. Proposals such as the Expatriation Prevention by Abolishing Tax-Related Incentives for Offshore Tenancy Act to rewrite the Reed Amendment and make it enforceable failed in committee in both 2012 and 2013.

=== Dual nationality ===
The Supreme Court ruled in Kawakita v. United States, 343 U.S. 717 (1952) that dual nationality is a long-recognized status in the law and that "a person may have and exercise rights of nationality in two countries and be subject to the responsibilities of both. The mere fact he asserts the rights of one nationality does not, without more, mean that he renounces the other". In Schneider v. Rusk, 377 U.S. 163 (1964), it found that persons who have been naturalized in the United States have the right to return to their native countries and to resume a former nationality while remaining a U.S. national. This applies even if they never return to the United States. Since 1990, the State Department has allowed multiple nationalities. Official policy is one of recognition that such a status exists, but the U.S. government does not endorse a policy of having multiple nationalities, though it is permitted. Dual nationality may run counter to expectations of government agencies in matters of security clearance or access to classified information. The State Department issued a memorandum in 2016, advising agencies of proper evaluation procedures to weigh the risks of plural nationality.

In 2025, Senator Bernie Moreno (R-OH) introduced the Exclusive Citizenship Act of 2025, which (if enacted) would require U.S. citizens with dual citizenship to renounce any other citizenship. This bill, designated as S.3283 (119th Congress), was referred to the Senate Judiciary Committee on December 1, 2025.

== See also ==
- United States v. Matheson
