= Nishikawa v. Dulles =

- Supreme Court of the United States

Argued May 1–2, 1957 Reargued October 28, 1957 Decided March 31, 1958
- Full case name: Mitsugi Nishikawa v. John Foster Dulles, Secretary of State
- Citations: 356 U.S. 129 (more) 78 S.Ct. 612; 2 L. Ed. 2d 659; 1958 U.S. LEXIS 1285

Case history
- Prior: 235 F.2d 135 (9th Cir. 1956); cert. granted, 352 U.S. 907 (1956).

Holding
- Citizenship may only be forfeited by a voluntary act; the Government must prove voluntariness by clear, convincing and unequivocal evidence.

Court membership
- Chief Justice Earl Warren Associate Justices Hugo Black · Felix Frankfurter; William O. Douglas · Harold H. Burton; Tom C. Clark · John M. Harlan II; William J. Brennan Jr. · Charles E. Whittaker

Case opinions
- Majority: Warren, joined by Black, Douglas, Brennan, Whittaker
- Concurrence: Black, joined by Douglas
- Concurrence: Frankfurter (in result), joined by Burton
- Dissent: Harlan, joined by Clark

Laws applied
- Nationality Act of 1940

Nishikawa v. Dulles, 356 U.S. 129 (1958), is a United States Supreme Court case in which the Court ruled that a dual United States/Japanese citizen who had served in the Japanese military during World War II could not be denaturalized unless the United States could prove that he had acted voluntarily.

Mitsugi Nishikawa, born in California to Japanese parents, went to Japan to study, and he was conscripted into the Japanese military in early 1941. After the end of the war, Nishikawa was informed by US officials that he had lost his citizenship because he had served in a foreign army. His case was eventually reviewed by the Supreme Court, which decided that the burden of proof must be on the government to prove that Nishikawa's Japanese military service was undertaken voluntarily before he could be stripped of his citizenship.

== Background ==
Mitsugi Nishikawa was born in Artesia, California in 1916, making him a US citizen by birth. Because his parents were Japanese citizens, he also had Japanese citizenship. He resided in the United States until August 1939, before the outbreak of World War II, when he went to Japan to study. On March 1, 1941, he was conscripted into the Japanese Army, nine months before the attack on Pearl Harbor, and he served as a mechanic. Japanese law provided a maximum sentence of three years for evading conscription. After the war, he applied to the US consulate in Japan for a US passport. Instead he was deprived of his US citizenship under section 401(c) of the Nationality Act 1940, which reads:

A person who is a national of the United States, whether by birth or naturalization, shall lose his nationality by: (c) Entering, or serving in, the armed forces of a foreign state unless expressly authorized by the laws of the United States, if he has or acquires the nationality of such foreign state ...

He petitioned a US district court for a declaration that he was still an American citizen because he had not enlisted voluntarily. He testified that in addition to the legal penalties for draft evasion, he was afraid of the violent reputation of the Japanese secret police and had been told that the US consulate would not have assisted him if he had sought help to avoid conscription. After Pearl Harbor, when he said to other Japanese soldiers that Japan could not win the war, he was regularly beaten every day for a month. The government called no evidence of its own. Nevertheless the district judge disbelieved him and confirmed his loss of citizenship. The decision was upheld by the Court of Appeals for the Ninth Circuit. Nishikawa appealed to the Supreme Court.

== Decision ==
The Supreme Court overturned the decisions of the courts below, holding that the Government bears the burden of proving not only that a citizen has enlisted in a foreign state but also that his enlistment was voluntary.

=== Precedents and argument ===
The court followed the decision of Mandoli v. Acheson, 344 U.S. 133 in which it had held that "it is settled that no conduct results in expatriation unless the conduct is engaged in voluntarily," a position not challenged by the State Department in argument. The court also followed Gonzales v. Landon, 350 U.S. 920, where the court had held that the burden of proof in cases of denaturalization under section 401(j) was on the Government "by clear, convincing and unequivocal evidence." The court extended this rule to cases under all subsections of section 401. In Schneiderman v. United States, 320 U.S. 118, the court had held that in a case concerning "the precious right of citizenship ... we believe the facts and the law should be construed as far as is reasonably possible in favor of the citizen."

The State Department argued that the normal burden of proving duress is on the party relying on it. Nishikawa argued that voluntariness was an intrinsic element of the conduct required by section 401.

=== Majority opinion ===
Chief Justice Warren delivered the opinion of the court:

Because the consequences of denationalization are so drastic petitioner's contention as to burden of proof of voluntariness should be sustained ...
The fact that this petitioner, after being conscripted, was ordered into active service in wartime on the side of a former enemy of this country must not be permitted to divert our attention from the necessity of maintaining a strict standard of proof in all expatriation cases. When the Government contends that the basic right of citizenship has been lost, it assumes an onerous burden of proof. Regardless of what conduct is alleged to result in expatriation, whenever the issue of voluntariness is put in issue, the Government must in each case prove voluntary conduct by clear, convincing and unequivocal evidence.

The court then examined the evidence on the district court record and found that there was insufficient evidence for the district judge's finding against Nishikawa: "Nor can the district judge's disbelief of petitioner's story of his motives and fears fill the evidentiary gap in the Government's case. The Government's only affirmative evidence was that petitioner went to Japan at a time when he was subject to conscription." The Court therefore remanded the case to the district court for issuance of a declaration that Nishikawa remained a US citizen.

=== Dissenting opinion ===
Justice Harlan (joined by Justice Clark) dissented, arguing that "To permit conscription without more to establish duress unjustifiably limits, if it does not largely nullify, the mandate of § 401(c)," since by 1940 conscription had become the main way of raising armies around the world. He also believed that the burden of proving duress should remain on Nishikawa: "One of the prime reasons for imposing the burden of proof on the party claiming involuntariness is that the evidence normally lies in his possession." He therefore thought that the Supreme Court should defer to the district judge's findings on Nishikawa's credibility.

== See also ==
- Kennedy v. Mendoza-Martinez
- Perez v. Brownell
- Afroyim v. Rusk
