= Trop v. Dulles =

- Supreme Court of the United States

Argued May 2, 1957 Reargued October 28–29, 1957 Decided March 31, 1958
- Full case name: Albert L. Trop v. John Foster Dulles, Secretary of State, et al.
- Citations: 356 U.S. 86 (more) 78 S. Ct. 590; 2 L. Ed. 2d 630; 1958 U.S. LEXIS 1284

Case history
- Prior: Both District and Second Circuit Court of Appeals rejected Trop's claim

Holding
- At least as applied in this case to a native-born citizen of the United States who did not voluntarily relinquish or abandon his citizenship or become involved in any way with a foreign nation, § 401(g) of the Nationality Act of 1940, as amended, which provides that a citizen "shall lose his nationality" by deserting the military or naval forces of the United States in time of war, provided he is convicted thereof by court martial and as a result of such conviction is dismissed or dishonorably discharged from the service, is unconstitutional.

Court membership
- Chief Justice Earl Warren Associate Justices Hugo Black · Felix Frankfurter; William O. Douglas · Harold H. Burton; Tom C. Clark · John M. Harlan II; William J. Brennan Jr. · Charles E. Whittaker

Case opinions
- Plurality: Warren, joined by Black, Douglas, Whittaker
- Concurrence: Black, joined by Douglas
- Concurrence: Brennan
- Dissent: Frankfurter, joined by Burton, Clark, Harlan

Laws applied
- U.S. Const. amend. VIII

Trop v. Dulles, 356 U.S. 86 (1958), was a United States Supreme Court case in which the court ruled that it was unconstitutional to revoke citizenship as a punishment for a crime. The ruling's reference to "evolving standards of decency" is frequently cited in Eighth Amendment jurisprudence.

== Background ==
Albert Trop was a natural born citizen of the United States who, while serving as a private in the United States Army in 1944, escaped from an Army stockade in Casablanca, Morocco. The next day, he willingly surrendered to an army officer and was taken back to the base, where he was subsequently court-martialed, convicted of desertion, and sentenced to three years at hard labor, forfeiture of pay, and a dishonorable discharge.

In 1952, Trop applied for a US passport, which was denied because §401(g) of the Nationality Act of 1940 provided that members of the armed forces of the United States who were convicted and dishonorably discharged for wartime desertion would lose their citizenship. (Note: A 1944 amendment modified the Act such that a deserter would lose his citizenship only if, on these grounds, he had been dishonorably discharged or dismissed from the military.)

Trop filed suit in US federal courts seeking declaratory judgment that he was a US citizen.

The US district court ruled in favor of the government, and the United States Court of Appeals for the Second Circuit upheld the decision of the district court. The Supreme court granted certiorari. The petitioner was represented by Osmond K. Fraenkel.

== Decision ==
The Supreme Court reversed. The decision, written by Chief Justice Earl Warren, cited Perez v. Brownell. In Perez the Court had held that citizenship could be divested in the exercise of the foreign affairs power. However, "denationalization as a punishment is barred by the Eighth Amendment," describing it as "a form of punishment more primitive than torture" as it inflicts the "total destruction of the individual's status in organized society." Further, the Court declared that the Eighth Amendment's meaning of cruel and unusual must change over time and "must draw its meaning from the evolving standards of decency that mark the progress of a maturing society".

Noting that "the civilized nations of the world are in virtual unanimity that statelessness is not to be imposed as punishment for crime”, the Court says that some countries allow expatriation of naturalized citizens who "engage in conduct in derogation of native allegiance".

Dissenting, Justice Felix Frankfurter noted that desertion from the military can be punished by the death penalty, leading him to ask, "Is constitutional dialectic so empty of reason that it can be seriously urged that loss of citizenship is a fate worse than death?". Frankfurter notes a case was decided that very day upholding loss of citizenship as a consequence of marrying a foreigner. He say it is "incongruous" for loss of citizenship to be "cruel and unusual" only when imposed as a consequence for criminal conduct.

== See also ==
- Weems v. United States (1910), a court case regarding what constitutes a "cruel and unusual" punishment
