= Perez v. Brownell =

- Supreme Court of the United States

Argued May 1, 1957 Reargued October 28, 1957 Decided March 31, 1958
- Full case name: Clemente Martinez Perez v. Herbert Brownell Jr., Attorney General
- Citations: 356 U.S. 44 (more) 78 S. Ct. 568; 2 L. Ed. 2d 603; 1958 U.S. LEXIS 1283

Case history
- Prior: Certiorari to the United States Court of Appeals for the Ninth Circuit

Holding
- Congress has the power to revoke a person's United States citizenship as a result of the voluntary performance of specified actions (such as voting in a foreign election), even in the absence of any intent or desire to lose citizenship.

Court membership
- Chief Justice Earl Warren Associate Justices Hugo Black · Felix Frankfurter; William O. Douglas · Harold H. Burton; Tom C. Clark · John M. Harlan II; William J. Brennan Jr. · Charles E. Whittaker

Case opinions
- Majority: Frankfurter, joined by Burton, Clark, Harlan, Brennan
- Dissent: Warren, joined by Black, Douglas
- Dissent: Douglas, joined by Black
- Dissent: Whittaker

Laws applied
- Nationality Act of 1940; U.S. Const. amend. XIV
- Overruled by
- Afroyim v. Rusk, 387 U.S. 253 (1967)

Perez v. Brownell, 356 U.S. 44 (1958), was a United States Supreme Court case in which the Court affirmed Congress's right to revoke United States citizenship as a result of a citizen's voluntary performance of specified actions, even in the absence of any intent or desire on the person's part to lose citizenship. Specifically, the Supreme Court upheld an act of Congress which provided for revocation of citizenship as a consequence of voting in a foreign election.

The precedent was repudiated nine years later in Afroyim v. Rusk, in which the Supreme Court held that the Fourteenth Amendment's Citizenship Clause guaranteed citizens' right to keep their citizenship and overturned the same law that it had upheld in Perez.

== Background ==
Clemente Martinez Perez was born in El Paso, Texas, on March 17, 1909. He resided in the United States until 1919 or 1920, when his parents took him to Mexico. In 1928, he was informed that he had been born in the state of Texas.

During World War II, he applied for admission and was admitted into the United States as a Mexican alien railroad worker. His application for such entry contained his recitation that he was a native-born citizen of Mexico. By 1947, however, Perez had returned to Mexico, and in that year, he applied for admission to the United States as a citizen of the United States. Upon his arrival, he was charged with failing to register under the Selective Service Laws of the United States during the war.

Under oath, Perez admitted that between 1944 and 1947, he had remained outside the United States to avoid military service and had voted in an election in Mexico in 1946.

On May 15, 1953, he surrendered to immigration authorities in San Francisco as an alien unlawfully in the United States but claimed that he was a citizen of the United States by birth and thereby entitled to remain. The US District Court, however, found that Perez had lost his American citizenship, a decision that was affirmed by the court of appeals.

The courts held that Congress can attach loss of citizenship only as a consequence of conduct engaged in voluntarily even if there was no intent or desire to lose citizenship. The law was enacted as the Nationality Act of 1940 (54 Stat 1137, as amended).

== Decision ==
In 1958, a divided Supreme Court upheld the decisions because Perez "became involved in foreign political affairs and evidenced an allegiance to another country inconsistent with American citizenship, thereby abandoning his citizenship."

Two central holdings were these:

The provision of the Fourteenth Amendment that "All persons born or naturalized in the United States, and subject to the jurisdiction thereof, are citizens of the United States," sets forth the two principal modes (but not the only ones) for acquiring citizenship, but nothing in the terms, the context, the history, or the manifest purpose of the Fourteenth Amendment warrants the inference of a restriction upon the power otherwise possessed by Congress to withdraw citizenship.

Congress, acting under the Necessary and Proper Clause of Art I, 8, cl 18, of the Federal Constitution, may attach loss of nationality to voting in a foreign political election, since the means, withdrawal of citizenship, is reasonably calculated to effect the end that is within the power of Congress to achieve, the avoidance of embarrassment in the conduct of foreign relations attributable to voting by American citizens in such elections, and the importance and extreme delicacy of the matters sought to be regulated demand that Congress be permitted ample scope in selecting appropriate modes for accomplishing its purpose.

== Subsequent developments ==
The court reversed itself in 1967 with its decision in Afroyim v. Rusk. It called section 401 of the Nationality Act of 1940 unconstitutional and stated that the Fourteenth Amendment prevents Congress from taking away citizenship without the citizen's assent.

== See also ==
- Nishikawa v. Dulles
