= P. Allan Dionisopoulos =

P. Allan Dionisopoulos (May 9, 1921 – July 6, 1993) was an American political scientist and legal scholar. A nationally recognized authority on the U.S. Constitution, his works have been quoted in U.S. Supreme Court decisions, as well as by a U.S. District Court in a Watergate-related case.

After earning several degrees from the University of Minnesota, Dionisopoulos earned his Ph.D. from the University of California, Los Angeles in 1960.

Dionisopoulos was a professor of political science at Northern Illinois University. He died in 1993 of congestive heart failure in Kishwaukee Community Hospital, DeKalb, Illinois.
