= Citizenship Clause =

First sentence of the Fourteenth Amendment to the United States Constitution

The Citizenship Clause is the first sentence of the Fourteenth Amendment to the United States Constitution, which was adopted on July 9, 1868, which states:

All persons born or naturalized in the United States, and subject to the jurisdiction thereof, are citizens of the United States and of the State wherein they reside.

This clause reversed a portion of the Dred Scott v. Sandford decision, which had declared that African Americans were not and could not become citizens of the United States or enjoy any of the privileges and immunities of citizenship.

The concepts of state and national citizenship were already mentioned in the original U.S. Constitution adopted in 1789, but the details were unclear. Prior to the Civil War, only some persons born or naturalized in the United States, and subject to the jurisdiction thereof, were citizens of the United States and of the state wherein they reside, according to the various applicable state and federal laws and court decisions.

The Civil Rights Act of 1866 granted U.S. citizenship to all persons born in the United States who were "not subject to any foreign power, excluding Indians not taxed". The 39th Congress proposed the principle underlying the Citizenship Clause due to concerns expressed about the constitutionality of the Civil Rights Act during floor debates in Congress. The framers of the Fourteenth Amendment sought to entrench the principle in the Constitution in order to prevent its being struck down by the Supreme Court or repealed by a future Congress.

== Pre-Amendment citizenship law ==
Before the adoption of the Fourteenth Amendment, the antebellum United States generally embraced the common-law doctrine of citizenship by birth within the country. Justice Joseph Story, dissenting in part, described the rule in Inglis v. Trustees of Sailor's Snug Harbor:

The rule commonly laid down in the books is, that every person who is born within the ligeance of a sovereign is a subject; and, e converso, that every person born without such allegiance is an alien. . . . Two things usually concur to create citizenship; first, birth locally within the dominions of the sovereign; and secondly, birth within the protection and obedience, or in other words, within the ligeance of the sovereign. That is, the party must be born within a place where the sovereign is at the time in full possession and exercise of his power, and the party must also at his birth derive protection from, and consequently owe obedience or allegiance to the sovereign, as such, de facto.

Story excluded children of ambassadors and the children of occupying enemy soldiers from those eligible for citizenship under the common law. But the rule also applied only to the people born of "free persons," thus excluding the children of slaves. The rule also excluded the children of Native Americans living in tribes, on the reasoning that they were born under the dominion of their tribes, and not within the purview of the law of the United States.

To those outside the above categories, the rule was generous in scope. One antebellum treatise, by William Rawle, stated: "Therefore every person born within the United States, its territories or districts, whether the parents are citizens or aliens, is a natural born citizen in the sense of the Constitution, and entitled to all the rights and privileges appertaining to that capacity." In the 1844 New York case of Lynch v. Clarke, the court held that the common law doctrine applied in the United States, and ruled that a child born in the country of a temporary visitor was a natural-born citizen under this rule.

Chancellor James Kent, in his Commentaries on American Law, framed the rule in terms similar to what would become the citizenship clause of the Fourteenth Amendment: “Natives,” he said, “are all persons born within the jurisdiction of the United States,” while “[a]n alien,” conversely, “is a person born out of the jurisdiction of the United States.”

The most significant challenge to the common law rule of birthright citizenship before the Civil War came from attacks on the rights of African-Americans, most famously in the United States Supreme Court's 1857 decision of Dred Scott v. Sandford, in which the court held that free African-Americans, though born in the United States, could not be citizens. The dissenting justices relied on the common law rule of citizenship to challenge the majority decision. Justice John McLean, in his dissent, said of Dred Scott himself, "Being born under our Constitution and laws, no naturalization is required, as one of foreign birth, to make him a citizen." And Justice Benjamin Curtis, in his dissent, stated, "[I]t is a principle of public law, recognized by the Constitution itself, that birth on the soil of a country both creates the duties and confers the rights of citizenship.”

During the American Civil War, Attorney General Edward Bates addressed an opinion letter to Treasury Secretary Salmon P. Chase, affirming the principle of birthright citizenship under the common law and touting its usefulness in the cause of racial equality:

As far as I know, Mr. Secretary, you and I have no better title to the citizenship which we enjoy than the "accident of birth"-the fact that we happened to be born in the United States. And our Constitution, in speaking of natural-born citizens, uses no affirmative language to make them such, but only recognizes and reaffirms the universal principle, common to all nations, and as old as political society, that the people born in a country do constitute the nation, and, as individuals, are natural members of the body politic. If this be a true principle, and I do not doubt it, it follows that every person born in the country is, at the moment of birth, prima facie a citizen; and he who would deny it must take upon himself the burden of proving some great disfranchisement strong enough to override the "natural-born" right as recognized by the Constitution in terms the most simple and comprehensive, and without any reference to race or color, or any other accidental circumstance.

After the Civil War, the U.S. Congress moved to grant citizenship to freed slaves, and to overrule the Dred Scott decision. Their first action was the Civil Rights Act of 1866, which declared: "... all persons born in the United States, and not subject to any foreign power, excluding Indians not taxed, are hereby declared to be citizens of the United States." Representative James F. Wilson of Iowa, upon introducing the citizenship clause of the Act, stated that it was "merely declaratory of what the law now is," and recounted at length the common law history of birthright citizenship. Representative John Bingham of Ohio affirmed that the clause was "simply declaratory of what is written in the Constitution," with specific reference to the "natural-born citizen" qualification for presidential office.

The Fourteenth Amendment's citizenship clause was drafted in response to Senator Benjamin Wade's concern that, although the question of citizenship was "settled by the civil rights bill, and, indeed, . . . was settled before," there was a danger that "the Government should fall into the hands of those who are opposed to the views that some of us maintain." Thus it was Congress's obligation to "fortify and make [the citizenship guarantee] very strong and clear."

== Text ==
Section 1, Clause 1, of the Fourteenth Amendment, reads:

All persons born or naturalized in the United States, and subject to the jurisdiction thereof, are citizens of the United States and of the State wherein they reside.

== Naturalization ==
The reference to naturalization in the Citizenship Clause is to the process by which immigrants are granted United States citizenship. Congress has power in relation to naturalization under the Naturalization Clause in Article I, Section 8, Clause 4 of the Constitution.

== Senate debate ==
The text of the Citizenship Clause was first offered in the Senate as an amendment to Section 1 of the joint resolution as passed by the House.

There are varying interpretations of the original intent of Congress, based on statements made during the congressional debate over the amendment. While the Citizenship Clause was intended to define as citizens exactly those so defined in the Civil Rights Act, which had been debated and passed in the same session of Congress only several months earlier, the clause's author, Senator Jacob M. Howard of Michigan, phrased it a little differently. In particular, the two exceptions to citizenship by birth for everyone born in the United States mentioned in the Act, namely, that they had to be "not subject to any foreign power" and not "Indians not taxed", were combined into a single qualification, that they be "subject to the jurisdiction" of the United States, and while Howard and others, such as Senate Judiciary Committee Chairman Lyman Trumbull of Illinois, the author of the Civil Rights Act, believed that the formulations were equivalent, others, such as Senator James R. Doolittle from Wisconsin, disagreed, and pushed for an alternative wording.

Howard, when introducing the addition to the Amendment, stated that it was "the law of the land already" and that it excluded only "persons born in the United States who are foreigners, aliens, who belong to the families of ambassadors or foreign ministers". Others also agreed that the children of ambassadors and foreign ministers were to be excluded. Concerning the children born in the United States to parents who are not U.S. citizens (and not foreign diplomats), however, three senators, including Trumbull, as well as President Andrew Johnson, debated how both the Civil Rights Act and the Citizenship Clause could confer citizenship on them at birth, and Trumbull stated that "What do we [the committee reporting the clause] mean by 'subject to the jurisdiction of the United States'? Not owing allegiance to anybody else. That is what it means." Senator Reverdy Johnson of Maryland commented that subject to the jurisdiction thereof in the proposed amendment undoubtedly meant the same thing as "not subject to some foreign power", and Trumbull asserted that this was already true prior to the passage of the Civil Rights Act, but Senator Edgar Cowan of Pennsylvania disagreed, arguing that this was only true for the children of European immigrants. Senator John Conness of California expressed support for the Amendment for giving a constitutional basis for birthright citizenship to all children born in the United States to any parentage (including Chinese noncitizen residents who do not intend to reside permanently in the United States), even though he (and others) thought it had already been guaranteed by the Act, whereas Cowan opposed the Amendment (and Act), arguing that it would have the undesirable outcome of extending citizenship to the children of Chinese and Romani immigrants.

Most of the debate on this section of the Amendment centered on whether the wording in the Civil Rights Act or Howard's proposal more effectively excluded Indians on reservations and in U.S. territories from citizenship. Doolittle asserted, and Senators Johnson of Maryland and Thomas A. Hendricks of Indiana concurred, that all Indians were subject to the jurisdiction of the United States, so that the phrase "Indians not taxed" would be preferable, but Trumbull and Howard disputed this, arguing that the U.S. government did not have full jurisdiction over Indian tribes, which governed themselves and made treaties with the United States. On the subject of citizenship for Indians, Trumbull said that "It is only those persons who come completely within our jurisdiction, who are subject to our laws, that we think of making citizens." Moreover, they objected to the phrase "Indians not taxed" on the basis that it could be construed as making citizenship dependent on wealth and also that it would allow states to manipulate who is a citizen in their state through tax policy.

In 2006, Goodwin Liu, then an assistant professor at the Boalt Hall law school of the University of California, Berkeley, and later an Associate Justice of the California Supreme Court, wrote that although the legislative history of the Citizenship Clause is "somewhat thin", the clause's central role is evident in the historical context of the post-Civil War period. Elizabeth Wydra, chief counsel of the Constitutional Accountability Center (a progressive think tank), argues that both supporters and opponents of the Citizenship Clause in 1866 shared the understanding that it would automatically grant citizenship to all persons born in the United States (except children of foreign ministers and invading armies)—an interpretation shared by then-Texas Solicitor General James C. Ho. Richard Aynes, dean of the University of Akron School of Law, takes a different view, proposing that the Citizenship Clause had "consequences which were unintended by the framers".

== Birthright citizenship ==
The Citizenship Clause has been interpreted to the effect that children born on United States soil, with very few exceptions, are U.S. citizens. This type of guarantee—legally termed jus soli, or "right of the territory"—does not exist in most of Europe, Asia or the Middle East, although it is part of English common law and is common in the Americas. Birthright citizenship for children born abroad to US citizen parents (jus sanguinis or "right of blood") is defined separately in federal law.

The “jurisdiction” requirement was considered in two Supreme Court cases. In Elk v. Wilkins, 112 U.S. 94 (1884), the Court held that Native American tribes represented independent political powers with no allegiance to the United States, and that their peoples were under a special jurisdiction of the United States. It held that a Native person born a citizen of a recognized tribal nation was not born an American citizen and did not become one simply by voluntarily leaving his tribe and settling among whites. The syllabus of the decision explained that a Native person "who has not been naturalized, or taxed, or recognized as a citizen either by the United States or by the state, is not a citizen of the United States within the meaning of the first section of the Fourteenth Article of Amendment of the Constitution". In 1870, the Senate Judiciary Committee also had expressed the proposition, saying: "the 14th amendment to the Constitution has no effect whatever upon the status of the Indian tribes within the limits of the United States". About 8% of the Native population at the time qualified for U.S. citizenship because they were "taxed", while others obtained citizenship by serving in the military, marrying whites or accepting land allotments, such as those granted under the Dawes Act. Children born to these Native American tribes therefore did not automatically receive citizenship under the Fourteenth Amendment if they voluntarily left their tribe. Native tribes that paid taxes were exempt from this ruling; their peoples were already citizens by an earlier act of Congress, and all non-citizen Natives were subsequently made citizens by the Indian Citizenship Act of 1924.

On the other hand, in United States v. Wong Kim Ark, the Supreme Court held that, under the Fourteenth Amendment to the U.S. Constitution, any child born in the United States is a US citizen from birth, with the sole exception of children born to a parent or parents with diplomatic immunity, since such parent is not a "subject to the US law". More broadly, the court characterized the statement, All persons born in the United States, and subject to the jurisdiction thereof, are citizens of the United States as "the broad and clear words of the Constitution," ruling that Wong's U.S. citizenship had been acquired by birth and had not been lost or taken away by anything happening since his birth.

A 2010 Congressional Research Service report observed that, though it could be argued that Congress has no power to define "subject to the jurisdiction" and the terms of citizenship in a manner contrary to the Supreme Court's understanding of the Fourteenth Amendment as expressed in Wong Kim Ark and Elk, since Congress does have broad power to pass necessary and proper legislation to regulate naturalization under the Constitution, Art. I, § 8, cls. 4 & 18 of the constitution Congress arguably has the power to define "subject to the jurisdiction thereof" for the purpose of regulating immigration.

Historian Eric Foner has explored the question of birthright citizenship and argues that "birthright citizenship stands as an example of the much-abused idea of American exceptionalism...birthright citizenship does make the United States (along with Canada) unique in the developed world. No European nation recognizes the principle."

Upon taking office for a second term on January 20, 2025, US president Donald Trump issued Executive Order 14160 titled "Protecting the Meaning and Value of American Citizenship" intending to end birthright citizenship in cases where neither parent is a citizen or lawful permanent resident of the US. The same day, civil rights and immigrant advocates joined by state attorneys general sued him over this executive order, claiming that it is unconstitutional. On January 23, 2025, U.S. District Judge John Coughenour issued a temporary restraining order preventing the implementation of the executive order and referred to it as "blatantly unconstitutional." The executive order was challenged in court, and the Supreme Court struck down the order on June 30, 2026 in the case Trump v. Barbara.

== Loss of citizenship ==
The Fourteenth Amendment does not provide any procedure for revocation of United States citizenship. The Supreme Court in Afroyim v. Rusk held that loss of 14th-Amendment-based U.S. citizenship is possible only under the following circumstances:

- Fraud in the naturalization process. Technically this is not loss of citizenship, but rather a voiding of the purported naturalization and a declaration that the immigrant never was a U.S. citizen.
- Voluntary relinquishment of citizenship. This may be accomplished either through renunciation procedures specially established by the State Department or through other actions (e.g., treason) that demonstrate an intention to give up U.S. citizenship. Such an act of expatriation must be accompanied by an intent to terminate United States citizenship.

For jus sanguinis U.S. citizenship, i.e., citizenship for the children born abroad of U.S. citizen parents, which is established only by congressional statute and not the U.S. Constitution (including its amendments), these restrictions do not apply (e.g., cf. Rogers v. Bellei, 401 U.S. 815 (1971)).

== Right to travel ==
In Saenz v. Roe, the Supreme Court held that this clause protects an aspect of the right to travel. Specifically, the Saenz Court said that the Citizenship Clause protects a citizen's right to resettle in other states and then be treated equally:

[T]he Citizenship Clause of the Fourteenth Amendment expressly equates citizenship with residence: "That Clause does not provide for, and does not allow for, degrees of citizenship based on length of residence." Zobel, 457 U. S., at 69. It is equally clear that the Clause does not tolerate a hierarchy of 45 subclasses of similarly situated citizens based on the location of their prior residence. … [T]he protection afforded to the citizen by the Citizenship Clause of that Amendment is a limitation on the powers of the National Government as well as the States.

The Saenz Court also mentioned the majority opinion in the Slaughterhouse Cases, which had stated that "a citizen of the United States can, of his own volition, become a citizen of any State of the Union by a bona fide residence therein, with the same rights as other citizens of that State."

== Natural-born citizens ==
The Oxford English Dictionary (OED) at "natural-born" defines it as a person who becomes a citizen at birth (as opposed to becoming one later). It lists this definition as going back to the 16th century. OED cites a law of 1695 (Act 7 & 8 Will. 3 (1696) 478) that states, "A Natural born Subject of this Realm ... Who shall be willing to Enter and Register himself for the Service of His Majesty." It also quotes Thomas Jefferson 1776 (in T. Jefferson Public Papers 344):

"All persons who ... propose to reside ... and who shall subscribe the fundamental laws, shall be considered as residents and entitled to all the rights of persons natural born."

Blacks Law Dictionary defines natural born citizen as "A person born within the jurisdiction of a national government". Webster's International Dictionary defines natural-born as "especially: having the legal status of citizen or subject".

Section 1 of Article Two of the United States Constitution requires that a candidate for President of the United States be a "natural-born citizen." According to a former edition of the US Department of State Foreign Affairs Manual:

"the fact that someone is a natural born citizen pursuant to a statute does not necessarily imply that he or she is such a citizen for Constitutional purposes."

The majority opinion by Justice Horace Gray in United States v. Wong Kim Ark observed that:

The constitution nowhere defines the meaning of these words ["citizen" and "natural born citizen"], either by way of inclusion or of exclusion, except in so far as this is done by the affirmative declaration that 'all persons born or naturalized in the United States, and subject to the jurisdiction thereof, are citizens of the United States.'

This observation by Gray about the term "natural-born citizen" was obiter dicta, since the case did not involve any controversy about presidential eligibility.

== Sources ==
- Congressional Globe (1866). "1st Session, 39th Congress, pt. 4". Debates and Proceedings, 1833-1873. pp. 2881–3840. covering the dates of May 29 to July 16.
