= Loss of citizenship =

Event of ceasing to be a country's citizen

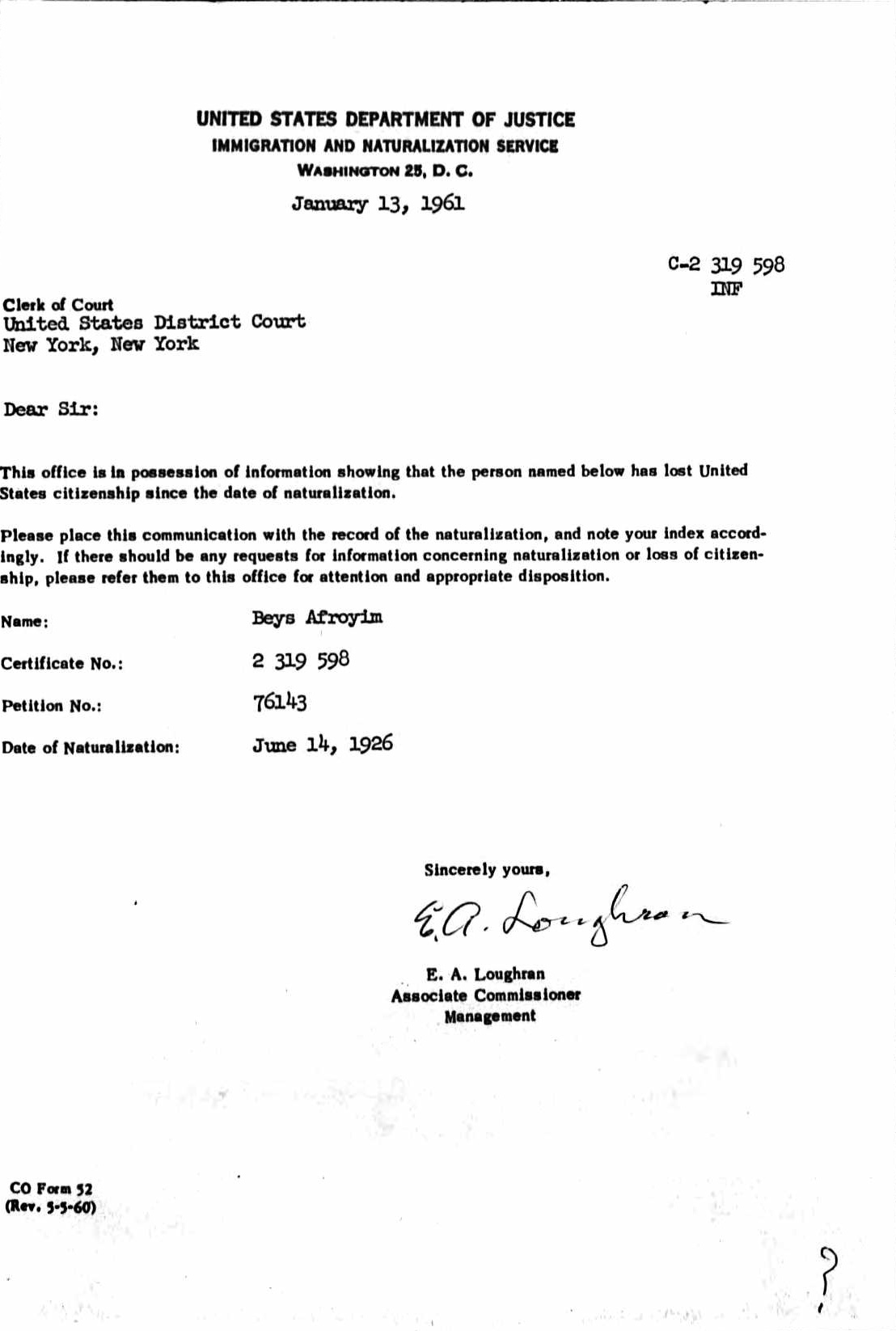
A 1961 letter from the Immigration and Naturalization Service, stating that Beys Afroyim had lost his U.S. citizenship. Afroyim became the subject of a landmark 1967 U.S. Supreme Court case, Afroyim v. Rusk.

Loss of citizenship, also referred to as loss of nationality, is the event of ceasing to be a citizen of a country under the nationality law of that country. This process can occur by various different grounds. Loss of citizenship can occur as a result of specific state or individual effort, or result unintentionally due to various legal or geopolitical conditions. Loss of citizenship is a process that mainly targets marginalized communities, such as underrepresented ethnic groups, transgender individuals, citizens of aspirant states, or those impacted by conflict around the world. Loss of citizenship is something that is protected against by international organizations, and therefore preventative efforts have been made. Loss of citizenship around the world has come to hurt efforts for sustainability, specifically the efforts outlined by the United Nations' Sustainable Development Goals (Goal 16.9). Furthermore, loss of citizenship also impacts the individual on legal and social grounds.

== Grounds ==
Citizenship can be lost in a variety of different ways. In a study of the nationality laws of thirty-three European countries, the European Union Democracy Observatory found nine broadly defined cases in which a citizen of a country may lose his or her citizenship through intentional efforts from themselves or their government. Alongside intentional efforts, various other grounds exist that challenge citizenship laws and efforts.

=== Renunciation ===
Citizenship can be lost voluntarily through renunciation. A person might renounce their citizenship in order to take up another citizenship.

=== Denaturalization ===
Citizenship can be lost involuntarily through denaturalization, also known as deprivation or forfeiture. Denaturalization is a process which has historically been applied to ethnic minorities, such as Haitians in the Dominican Republic. A person might have their citizenship revoked in this way due to:

- Fraud in the naturalization process, including sham marriages
- Failure to renounce another citizenship after having committed to doing so in a naturalization procedure
- Severe legal breaches such as treason

=== Grounds applying to children ===
Children can sometimes lose their citizenship at the same time as their parent doing so, just as they might acquire citizenship at the same time as their parent. Children may also lose their citizenship following adoption by a foreigner or other changes in relation to their parents such as annulment of maternity/paternity. Furthermore, children born from migrants are also groups at risk for loss of citizenship depending on the jus soli or jus sanguinis basis for citizenship law in the country they were born.

=== Challenges applying to transgender individuals ===
Transgender individuals experience challenges within existing legal structures regarding citizenship. When one undergoes a transition process, they make changes to their identity that call for alterations of existing forms of identification. For example, through Europe, there exists limited legislation that pertains to the process of identification alteration concerning transgender individuals; these countries often rely upon general anti-discriminatory laws, or judicial precedent. In Poland, legislation prohibits changes to citizen identification that occur from non-domestic sources; under this system, transgender individuals who receive transition processes abroad are unable to have their updated identities transcribed. Furthermore, when LGBTQ individuals, particularly transgender individuals, are forced out of their country of origin for any means, they often face social and legal barriers to attaining new citizenship. A lack of legislation regarding transgender individual identity can pose challenges to transgender individuals, limiting their access to the benefits of citizenship.

=== Challenges applying to citizens of aspirant states ===
Another group of individuals impacted by the loss of citizenship are citizens of aspirant states. The international status of aspirant state nationality has direct impacts upon the citizenship of those who are claimed by these states. Due to the volatility of state recognition, citizens of aspirant states rely upon less secure citizenship documents, which threatens the benefits one may receive from citizenship. When a country loses international recognition as a nation, its people lose their citizenship on an international scale. As a result of the conditions created within aspirant states, citizens of these states often suffer from statelessness.

=== Challenges from poor institutions ===
In some cases, poor institutional systems of identification result in statelessness. Oftentimes countries will develop new systems of birth registration and identification in order to secure citizenship. However these countries often lack the resources to implement these new systems properly, which results in situations that could create statelessness. For example, in Indonesia, a new system of identification based on number was implemented in 2006. The process was highly bureaucratic, but lacked the proper breadth required to give numbers to all citizens. Those left without a number continue to great struggle appealing through the bureaucracy to get their citizenship back. Furthermore, under armed conflict, institutions of identification struggle even more, as conflict causes migration, loss of territory, and absorbs state resources; These conditions can be seen in war-torn countries, like Ukraine, Syria, Iraq and others.

=== Other grounds ===
Finally, citizenship can be lost through a variety of other grounds, that are often not clearly voluntary or involuntary. One action that is taken voluntarily (e.g. serving in a foreign military) can lead to a subsequent involuntary loss. Some of these grounds include:

- Voluntary acquisition of another citizenship
- Residing abroad on a permanent basis
- Serving in a foreign military or foreign government
- Failure to reaffirm one's citizenship by a certain age (often an age between 18 and 30 years old)
- Failure to revoke other citizenships by a certain age (e.g. 22 years old in the case of Japan)

Such loss of citizenship may take place without the knowledge of the affected citizen, and indeed without the knowledge of the government. Until the government's officials (e.g. embassy staff) are informed, the government may continue to retain the person's name in its citizenship records.

== Prevention ==
Countries may have legal provisions to prevent the loss of citizenship, particularly where the loss would make the person stateless. These provisions often stem from international treaties that prevent governments from making people stateless, as well as limiting individual's ability to voluntarily make themselves stateless.

=== United Nations ===
The United Nations have made express efforts to combat loss of citizenship, and the condition of statelessness. In United Nations' Sustainable Development Goal 16.9, 'legal identity for all' is called for. Furthermore, Article 7 of the Convention on the Reduction of Statelessness provides that "[l]aws for the renunciation of a nationality shall be conditional upon a person's acquisition or possession of another nationality".

However, these provisions are not considered a peremptory norm which binds non-signatories to the Convention. Ultimately, the call for 'legal identity for all' from the United Nations is a goal which presents challenges due to the complexity by which some lose their citizenship.

== Countries ==
Most countries have provisions that allow for renunciation and denaturalization.

The following countries have provisions for loss of citizenship that go beyond the norm:

- Belgium – Belgian citizens residing abroad between the ages of 18 and 28 can lose citizenship if they meet certain conditions.
- Japan – Japanese children born with an additional citizenship lose Japanese citizenship if they fail to give up the other citizenship before the age of 22.
- Switzerland – Swiss citizens who have not been registered by the age of 25 lose citizenship.
- Mexico – Naturalized Mexican citizens lose citizenship after 5 years of residence abroad.
