= Schneider v. Rusk =

- Supreme Court of the United States

Argued April 2, 1964 Decided May 18, 1964
- Full case name: Schneider v. Rusk
- Citations: 377 U.S. 163 (more) 84 S. Ct. 1187; 12 L. Ed. 2d 218; 1964 U.S. LEXIS 1275

Case history
- Prior: Judgment for defendant, 218 F. Supp. 302 (D.D.C. 1963); probable jurisdiction noted, 375 U.S. 893 (1963).
- Subsequent: None

Holding
- Naturalized U.S. citizens have the right to return to and reside in their native countries, and retain their U.S. citizenship, even if they never return to the United States.

Court membership
- Chief Justice Earl Warren Associate Justices Hugo Black · William O. Douglas; Tom C. Clark · John M. Harlan II; William J. Brennan Jr. · Potter Stewart; Byron White · Arthur Goldberg

Case opinions
- Majority: Douglas, joined by Warren, Black, Stewart, Goldberg
- Dissent: Clark, joined by Harlan, White
- Brennan took no part in the consideration or decision of the case.

Laws applied
- U.S. Const. amend. V

Schneider v. Rusk, 377 U.S. 163 (1964), was a 5–3 United States Supreme Court case that invalidated a law that stripped naturalized Americans of their citizenship as a result of extended or permanent residence abroad. Relying on the due process clause of the Fifth Amendment, the court ruled it generally was unconstitutional to treat naturalized and natural-born citizens differently.

== Background ==
Angelika Schneider, a German immigrant, came to the U.S. with her parents and became a United States citizen upon their naturalization at age 16. When she graduated from college, she moved back to Germany.

The State Department claimed Schneider had lost her U.S. citizenship in accordance with a section of the Immigration and Nationality Act, which revoked the citizenship of any naturalized citizen who returned to his or her country of birth and remained there for at least three years.

== Opinion ==
The Supreme Court held that, since no provision of the law stripped natural-born Americans of their citizenship as a result of extended or permanent residence abroad, it was unconstitutionally discriminatory to apply such a rule only to naturalized citizens.

The opinion, however, noted the natural-born-citizen clause of the U.S. Constitution permitted naturalized and natural-born citizens to be treated differently with respect to who is eligible to serve as the president of the United States: "The only difference drawn by the Constitution is that only the 'natural born' citizen is eligible to be President".

== Sources ==
- Schneider v. Rusk: Great American Court Cases
- The Supreme Court: Welcome Home TIME, May 29, 1964
