= Vance v. Terrazas =

- Supreme Court of the United States

Argued October 30, 1979 Decided January 15, 1980
- Full case name: Cyrus Vance, Secretary of State v. Laurence J. Terrazas
- Citations: 444 U.S. 252 (more) 100 S. Ct. 540; 62 L. Ed. 2d 461

Case history
- Prior: Terrazas v. Vance, 577 F.2d 7 (7th Cir. 1978)
- Subsequent: Terrazas v. Muskie, 494 F. Supp. 1017 (N.D. Ill. 1980); Terrazas v. Haig, 653 F.2d 285 (7th Cir. 1981)

Holding
- An American cannot have his U.S. citizenship taken away against his will. Intent to give up citizenship needs to be established by itself and cannot be irrebuttably presumed merely because a person did something established by law as an action automatically causing loss of citizenship. However, Congress has power to decide that an intent to give up citizenship may be established by preponderance of evidence.

Court membership
- Chief Justice Warren E. Burger Associate Justices William J. Brennan Jr. · Potter Stewart; Byron White · Thurgood Marshall; Harry Blackmun · Lewis F. Powell Jr. William Rehnquist · John P. Stevens

Case opinions
- Majority: White, joined by Burger, Blackmun, Powell, Rehnquist
- Concur/dissent: Marshall
- Concur/dissent: Stevens
- Dissent: Brennan, joined by Stewart (part II)

Laws applied
- U.S. Const. amends. V, XIV; Immigration and Nationality Act of 1952

Vance v. Terrazas, 444 U.S. 252 (1980), was a United States Supreme Court decision that established that a United States citizen cannot have their citizenship taken away unless they have acted with an intent to give up that citizenship. The Supreme Court overturned portions of an act of Congress which had listed various actions and had said that the performance of any of these actions could be taken as conclusive, irrebuttable proof of intent to give up U.S. citizenship. However, the Court ruled that a person's intent to give up citizenship could be established through a standard of preponderance of evidence (i.e., more likely than not) — rejecting an argument that intent to relinquish citizenship could only be found on the basis of clear, convincing and unequivocal evidence.

== Background ==
Laurence Terrazas was born in the United States in 1947. Because Terrazas's father was Mexican and because Mexico's citizenship laws then followed the principle of jus sanguinis, Terrazas held Mexican citizenship at birth and because he was born in the United States, Terrazas also held US citizenship under the jus soli of the Fourteenth Amendment; therefore, Terrazas was a dual citizen of the United States and Mexico at birth.

While enrolled at a Mexican university in 1970, Terrazas applied for a certificate of Mexican nationality. As part of his application, Terrazas signed a statement renouncing "United States citizenship, as well as any submission, obedience and loyalty to any foreign government, especially to that of the United States of America."

During subsequent discussions with a US consular official, Terrazas gave conflicting answers as to whether or not he had truly intended to abandon his rights as a US citizen when he applied for his certificate of Mexican nationality. The State Department eventually concluded that he had lost his US citizenship, a decision which Terrazas appealed, first before the State Department's board of appellate review, and subsequently to the courts.

Before the 1967 Supreme Court ruling in Afroyim v. Rusk, US law had provided for numerous ways for citizens to lose their citizenship. In its Afroyim ruling, the Supreme Court held that the Fourteenth Amendment barred Congress from revoking anyone's citizenship without their consent. Specifically, the court held that a law automatically revoking the citizenship of anyone who had voted in a foreign election was unconstitutional and unenforceable. However, US law continued, after Afroyim to list several other "expatriating acts", the voluntary performance of any of which would result in automatic loss of citizenship.

The 7th Circuit Court of Appeals ruled that according to Afroyim v. Rusk, "Congress is constitutionally devoid of the power" to revoke citizenship; and that Congress had no power to legislate any evidentiary standard for proving Terrazas's intent to relinquish his citizenship that fell short of a requirement of proof by clear, convincing and unequivocal evidence. The Secretary of State appealed this ruling to the Supreme Court, questioning not only the appellate court's finding on the required standard of proof, but also challenging the finding that a separate intent to give up citizenship was required (as opposed merely to the performance of a designated expatriating act).

== Opinion ==
A 5–4 majority of the Supreme Court held that it was not enough for the government to prove "the voluntary commission of an act, such as swearing allegiance to a foreign nation, that 'is so inherently inconsistent with the continued retention of American citizenship that Congress may accord to it its natural consequences, i.e., loss of nationality.'" Rather, the court held that its 1967 ruling in Afroyim v. Rusk "emphasized that loss of citizenship requires the individual's 'assent', ... in addition to his voluntary commission of the expatriating act" and that "the trier of fact must in the end conclude that the citizen not only voluntarily committed the expatriating act prescribed in the statute, but also intended to relinquish his citizenship." On that point, the Supreme Court agreed with the 7th Circuit ruling in Terrazas's favor.

The majority then turned its attention to the question of a standard of proof in loss-of-citizenship cases. Terrazas had argued and the 7th Circuit had agreed that the 14th Amendment, as interpreted in Afroyim, had left Congress without any constitutional authority to set the standard of proof for intent to relinquish citizenship at a level any lower than one of clear and convincing evidence. The Supreme Court majority rejected this claim and held that Congress was within its rights to specify a standard of preponderance of evidence (more likely than not) when cases alleging loss of US citizenship were involved.

Finally, the Supreme Court majority upheld the validity of another aspect of the law as enacted by Congress: that the government could assume that a potentially expatriating act had been performed voluntarily and that any claim that a person had acted under duress was up to the person involved to establish by preponderance of evidence.

The Supreme Court did not explicitly rule on whether or not Terrazas had lost his US citizenship; rather, it remanded the case back to the original trial court (a Federal District Court in Illinois) for further proceedings consistent with the court's ruling.

Although the court's membership was divided on the question of whether a "preponderance of evidence" standard was sufficient for establishing someone's intent to give up their U.S. citizenship, all nine judges agreed with the key holding in Afroyim v. Rusk that US citizenship was safeguarded by the Fourteenth Amendment and could not be taken away by an act of Congress from a person without consent.

=== Dissents ===
The four justices who disagreed with the majority filed three separate dissenting opinions. All of the dissenting justices supported the Afroyim v. Rusk principle that retention of US citizenship was a constitutionally protected right, and they all agreed (contrary to the court's majority) that Terrazas's actions should not have led to the loss of his citizenship.

Justice Thurgood Marshall rejected the majority's decision that an intent to give up citizenship could be established merely by a preponderance of evidence. Arguing that "the Court's casual dismissal of the importance of American citizenship cannot withstand scrutiny", he said that he "would hold that a citizen may not lose his citizenship in the absence of clear and convincing evidence that he intended to do so."

Justice John Paul Stevens also argued that "a person's interest in retaining his American citizenship is surely an aspect of 'liberty' of which he cannot be deprived without due process of law" and that "due process requires that a clear and convincing standard of proof be met" in Terrazas's case or others like it. Additionally, Stevens felt that Congress had not adequately addressed the question of specific intent to relinquish citizenship. He wrote: "Since we accept dual citizenship, taking an oath of allegiance to a foreign government is not necessarily inconsistent with an intent to remain an American citizen. Moreover, as now written, the statute cannot fairly be read to require a finding of specific intent to relinquish citizenship."

Justices William J. Brennan, Jr., and Potter Stewart argued that since Terrazas was born a dual US/Mexican national, his having taken an oath of allegiance to Mexico was consistent with his being a citizen of the U.S. In Brennan's words: "The formal oath [of allegiance to Mexico] adds nothing to the existing foreign citizenship and, therefore, cannot affect his United States citizenship." Brennan argued, in addition, that since "Congress has provided for a procedure by which one may formally renounce citizenship" before US consular officials, a procedure that all conceded that Terrazas did not use, Terrazas was still a US citizen.

== Subsequent developments ==
After receiving Terrazas's case from the Supreme Court on remand, the district court again ruled that Terrazas had lost his citizenship. On subsequent appeal, the 7th Circuit Court of Appeals reversed its earlier decision and, this time using a preponderance-of-evidence standard per the instructions of the Supreme Court, ruled against him, finding this time that there was "abundant evidence that plaintiff intended to renounce his United States citizenship when he acquired the Certificate of Mexican Nationality willingly, knowingly, and voluntarily." Among other reasons for this finding, the court noted that he became a Mexican citizen when faced with the possibility of being conscripted into the United States Armed Forces (as he had lost his deferments and passed the physical) and that he had "sought to inform his draft board" about his loss of citizenship. Since the office of U.S. Secretary of State changed hands twice following the Supreme Court's ruling in the case, Edmund Muskie replacing Cyrus Vance in 1980, and Alexander Haig assuming the position in 1981, the subsequent lower court cases are known as Terrazas v. Muskie and Terrazas v. Haig.

Congress amended the Immigration and Nationality Act in 1986 to specify, as required by Vance v. Terrazas, that a potentially expatriating act may result in loss of citizenship only if it was performed "with the intention of relinquishing United States nationality."

Although the Terrazas ruling left intact Congress's right to specify a preponderance-of-evidence standard for judging intent to give up citizenship, the State Department in 1990 adopted a policy that pursues loss-of-citizenship proceedings issues usually only when an individual affirmatively states the intent to relinquish citizenship. When a case involving possible expatriation comes to the attention of a US consular officer, the officer will normally "simply ask the applicant if there was intent to relinquish U.S. citizenship when performing the act. If the answer is no, the consular officer will certify that it was not the person's intent to relinquish U.S. citizenship and, consequently, find that the person has retained U.S. citizenship."

A bill was introduced in 2005, which sought, among other things, to force the State Department to abolish the above policy on loss of citizenship and reinstate its pre-1990 policy "of viewing dual/multiple citizenship as problematic and as something to be discouraged, not encouraged." However, the bill never made it to the floor of the House and died in committee when the 109th Congress adjourned.

== See also ==
- Multiple citizenship
- United States nationality law
- List of United States Supreme Court cases, volume 444
