= Relinquishment of United States nationality =

Legal procedure to relinquish American citizenship

- Long title: Section 349 of the Immigration and Nationality Act of 1952: Loss of nationality by native-born or naturalized citizen; voluntary action; burden of proof; presumptions
- Enacted by: the 82nd United States Congress
- Effective: June 27, 1952

Citations
- Statutes at Large: 66 Stat. 163, 268

Codification
- Acts repealed: Expatriation Act of 1907 (Pub. L. 59–193); Section 401 of the Nationality Act of 1940 (Pub. L. 76–853; 8 U.S.C. § 801)
- U.S.C. sections created: 8 U.S.C. § 1481

Legislative history
- Introduced in the House as H.R. 5678 by Francis E. Walter (D-PA) and Pat McCarran (D-NV) on October 9, 1951

Major amendments
- Expatriation Act of 1954 (Pub. L. 83–772); Repeal of Certain Expatriation Provisions of the Immigration and Nationality Act, 1978 (Pub. L. 95–432); Immigration and Nationality Act Amendments of 1986 (Pub. L. 99–653)

United States Supreme Court cases
- (including cases involving the Bancroft Treaties, Sections 2 and 3 of the Expatriation Act of 1907, and Section 401 of the Nationality Act of 1940): Mackenzie v. Hare, 239 U.S. 299 (1915); Perkins v. Elg, 307 U.S. 325 (1939); Savorgnan v. United States, 338 U.S. 491 (1950); Perez v. Brownell, 356 U.S. 44 (1958); Trop v. Dulles, 356 U.S. 86 (1958); Nishikawa v. Dulles, 356 U.S. 129 (1958); Kennedy v. Mendoza-Martinez, 372 U.S. 144 (1963); Schneider v. Rusk, 377 U.S. 163 (1964); Afroyim v. Rusk, 387 U.S. 253 (1967); Rogers v. Bellei, 401 U.S. 815 (1971); Vance v. Terrazas, 444 U.S. 252 (1980)

Under United States federal law, a U.S. citizen or national may voluntarily and intentionally give up that status and become an alien with respect to the United States. Relinquishment is distinct from denaturalization, which in U.S. law refers solely to cancellation of illegally procured naturalization.

8 U.S.C. § 1481(a) explicitly lists all seven potentially expatriating acts by which a U.S. citizen can relinquish that citizenship. Renunciation of United States citizenship is a legal term encompassing two of those acts: swearing an oath of renunciation at a U.S. embassy or consulate in foreign territory or, during a state of war, at a U.S. Citizenship and Immigration Services office in U.S. territory. The other five acts are: naturalization in a foreign country; taking an oath of allegiance to a foreign country; serving in a foreign military; serving in a foreign government; and committing treason, rebellion, or similar crimes. Beginning with a 1907 law, Congress had intended that mere voluntary performance of potentially expatriating acts would automatically terminate citizenship. However, a line of Supreme Court cases beginning in the 1960s, most notably Afroyim v. Rusk (1967) and Vance v. Terrazas (1980), held this to be unconstitutional and instead required that specific intent to relinquish citizenship be proven by the totality of the individual's actions and words. Since a 1990 policy change, the State Department no longer proactively attempts to prove such intent, and issues a Certificate of Loss of Nationality (CLN) only when an individual "affirmatively asserts" their relinquishment of citizenship.

People who relinquish U.S. citizenship generally have lived abroad for many years, and nearly all of them are citizens of another country. Unlike most other countries, the U.S. does not prohibit its citizens from making themselves stateless, but the State Department strongly recommends against it, and very few choose to do so. Since the end of World War II, no individual has successfully relinquished U.S. citizenship while in U.S. territory, and courts have rejected arguments that U.S. state citizenship or Puerto Rican citizenship give an ex-U.S. citizen the right to enter or reside in the U.S. without the permission of the U.S. government. Like any other foreigner or stateless person, an ex-U.S. citizen requires permission from the U.S. government, such as a U.S. visa or visa waiver, in order to visit the United States.

Relinquishment of U.S. citizenship remains uncommon in absolute terms, but has become more frequent than relinquishment of the citizenship of most other developed countries. Between three thousand and six thousand U.S. citizens have relinquished citizenship each year since 2013, compared to estimates of anywhere between three million and nine million U.S. citizens residing abroad. The number of relinquishments is up sharply from lows in the 1990s and 2000s, though only about three times as high as in the 1970s. Lawyers believe this growth is mostly driven by American citizens at birth who were raised abroad and only became aware of their U.S. citizenship and the tax liabilities for citizens abroad due to ongoing publicity surrounding the 2010 Foreign Account Tax Compliance Act. Between 2010 and 2015, obtaining a CLN began to become a difficult process with high barriers, including nearly year-long waitlists for appointments and the world's most expensive administrative fee, as well as complicated tax treatment. Legal scholars state that such barriers may constitute a breach of the United States' obligations under international law, and foreign legislatures have called upon the U.S. government to eliminate the fees, taxes, and other requirements, particularly with regard to accidental Americans who have few genuine links to the United States (see the Nottebohm case).

== Terminology ==
In general, "loss of citizenship" is a blanket term which may include both voluntary (citizen-initiated) and involuntary (government-initiated) termination of citizenship, though it is not always easy to make a clean distinction between the two categories: automatic loss of citizenship due to an initial action performed voluntarily could be seen either as "voluntary loss" or "involuntary loss". Citizen-initiated termination of citizenship may be referred to as "renunciation", "relinquishment", or "expatriation", while the term "denationalization" refers to government-initiated termination.

In U.S. law, "relinquishment" and "renunciation" are terms used in Subchapter III, Part 3 of the Immigration and Nationality Act of 1952 (8 U.S.C. §§ 1481–1489). The term "expatriation" was used in the initial version of that act (66 Stat. 163, 268) up until the Immigration and Nationality Act Amendments of 1986, when it was replaced by "relinquishment". The State Department continues to use both the terms "expatriation" and "relinquishment", and refers to the acts listed in 8 U.S.C. § 1481(a) as "potentially expatriating acts". "Renunciation" specifically describes two of those acts: swearing an oath of renunciation before a U.S. diplomatic officer outside of the United States, or before a U.S. government official designated by the Attorney-General inside the United States during a state of war. "Relinquishment" refers to all seven acts including renunciation, but some sources use it contrastively to refer solely to the other five acts besides renunciation. In contrast, "denaturalization" is distinct from expatriation: that term is used solely in Subchapter III, Part 2 of the 1952 INA (8 U.S.C. §§ 1421–1459) to refer to court proceedings for cancellation of fraudulently procured naturalization.

Relinquishment of United States nationality encompasses relinquishment of United States citizenship. "Nationality" and "citizenship" are distinct under U.S. law: all people with U.S. citizenship also have U.S. nationality, but American Samoans and some residents of the Northern Mariana Islands have U.S. nationality without citizenship. Both citizens and non-citizen nationals may undertake the process of relinquishment of United States nationality. A citizen who undertakes that process gives up both citizenship and nationality. It is not possible to relinquish U.S. citizenship while retaining U.S. nationality.

People who relinquish U.S. citizenship are called "relinquishers", while those who specifically renounce U.S. citizenship are called "renunciants". The informal term "last-generation Americans", wordplay on terminology for immigrant generations (such as "first-generation Americans" or "second-generation Americans"), is also used. The terms "expatriation" or "expatriates" may lead to some confusion, as in modern parlance an "expatriate" ("expat") is simply a person who resides abroad, without any implication of giving up citizenship.

== Numbers ==
From 2014 to 2016, an average of about five thousand U.S. citizens gave up their citizenship each year. These numbers have risen by nearly ten times between 2005 and 2015, though they remain only about three times the annual numbers in the 1970s.

In absolute terms, few people relinquish U.S. citizenship or citizenship of any other developed country; in almost all countries, the number of people who give up citizenship each year is small relative to the total number of citizens abroad, let alone the total number of citizens in that country. In a 2017 study of citizenship relinquishments in twenty-eight countries, mostly OECD members, the U.S. came in sixth place in relative terms (i.e. relinquishers as a proportion of citizens abroad), behind Singapore, South Korea, Taiwan, Estonia, and Japan; and second in absolute numbers behind South Korea. The study author noted that emotional factors and prohibitions on dual citizenship may affect the rates of citizenship relinquishment, and that military conscription may explain the high rates in the other top countries besides the United States. (Note: For general discussion of conscription in the other countries mentioned, see Estonian Defence Forces#Conscription, conscription in Singapore, conscription in South Korea, and conscription in Taiwan (Japan does not practice military conscription). For general discussion of the treatment of multiple citizenship in those countries, see Estonian nationality law#Dual citizenship, Japanese nationality law#Dual nationality, Singaporean nationality law#Dual citizenship, South Korean nationality law#Dual citizenship, and Nationality law of the Republic of China#Dual nationality and naturalization.) Peter Spiro notes that most countries with military conscription provide exemptions for non-resident citizens. Regardless of the reasons, even for South Korea, the top country, only about 0.7% of citizens abroad relinquish each year, while for the U.S. the rate is only about 0.1%, though in both cases unreliability of population figures for citizens abroad means the rates are open to question. One former Foreign Service Officer, noting that State Department estimates of the population of U.S. citizens abroad have grown from 3.2 million in 2004 to 9 million in 2017, argues that these estimates were "generated to justify consular assets and budget" and so "may be self-serving".

The graph above presents statistics on relinquishment of U.S. citizenship from three sources. (Note: A similar chart which combines the State Department data and the Quarterly Publication up to 2017 can be found in Fraser, Erin L. (July 2017). "The Roots and Fruits of Section 6039G" (PDF). California Tax Lawyer. 26 (3): 40. SSRN 2827716. Archived from the original (PDF) on May 18, 2019.) The blue bars are State Department statistics from 1962 to 1994 obtained by the Joint Committee on Taxation (JCT). During that period, a total of 37,818 U.S. citizens renounced or abandoned their citizenship. It is not clear which of these statistics refer solely to renunciants or include other relinquishers as well; the JCT stated that there were inconsistencies between the definitions used for the statistics for 1962 to 1979 and for 1980 to 1994. The green bars reflect the number of records of people who have renounced U.S. citizenship added each year to the National Instant Criminal Background Check System (2006–present). This series includes renunciants and not other relinquishers (see below). The FBI added a large backlog of entries in 2012, so figures from that year may not be comparable to other years. The red bars reflect the number of entries in the Internal Revenue Service's Quarterly Publication of Individuals Who Have Chosen to Expatriate (1996–present). Statistics for 1996 and 1997 may not be comparable to later years. Lawyers disagree whether this publication includes the names of all former citizens, or just some (see below).

The proportion of renunciations or other individual expatriating acts among the total number of relinquishments has been reported on occasion. A Los Angeles Times article stated that between 1951 and 1973, a total of 10,000 Americans renounced their citizenship, while another 71,900 lost it "either unknowingly or deliberately, by acquiring a foreign passport". Law journal articles in 1975 and 1976 stated that there were 95,000 "administrative determinations of voluntary abandonment of United States citizenship" from 1945 to 1969, including 40,000 on grounds of voting in a foreign election. In the 1980s, renunciations accounted for about one-fifth of all relinquishments of citizenship, according to State Department statistics: there were roughly 200 to 300 renunciations per year, among a total of between 800 and 1,600 relinquishments per year. In 2015, the State Department forecast that there would be 5,986 renunciations and 559 non-renunciatory relinquishments during that fiscal year.

== Process ==
=== Overview ===
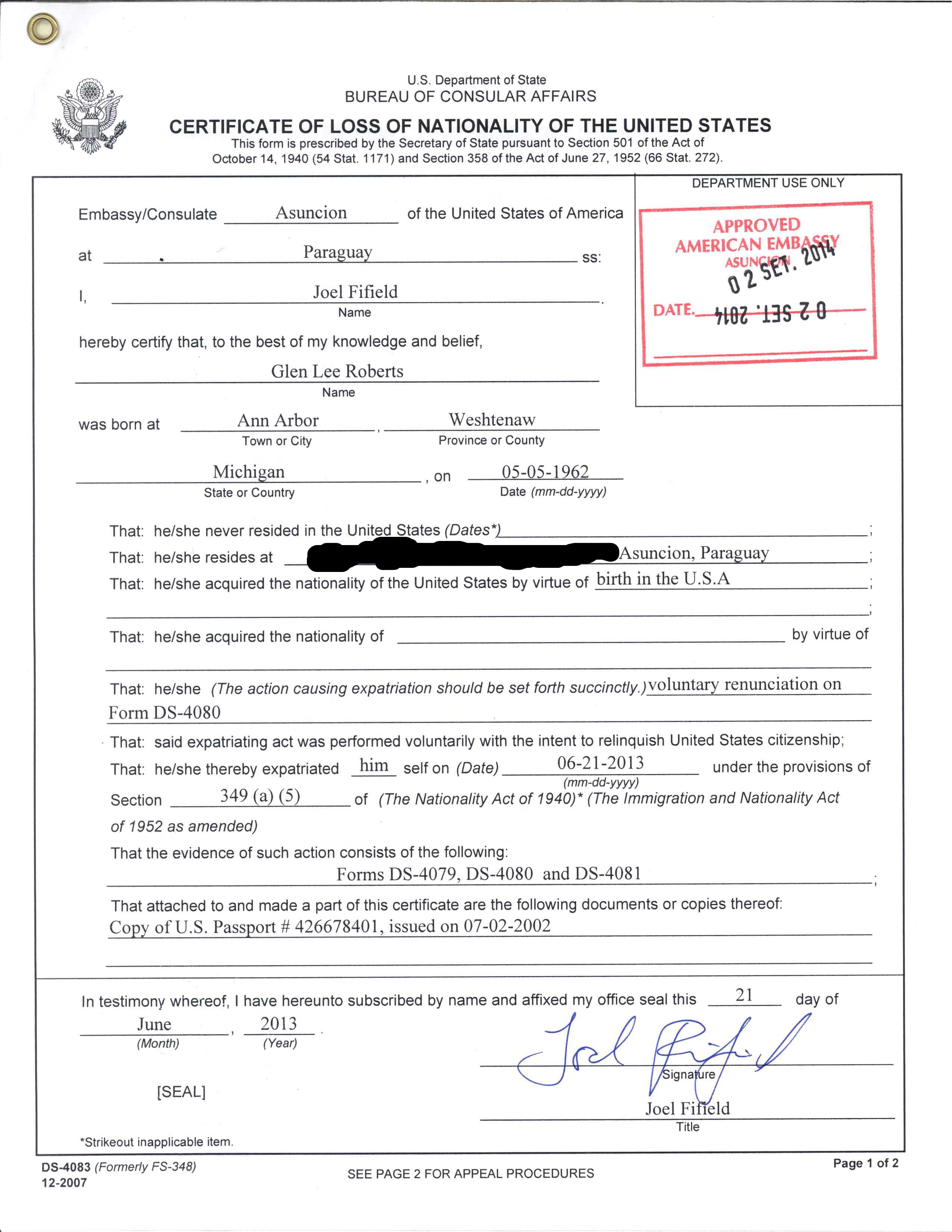
A Certificate of Loss of Nationality of the United States, issued to an ex-citizen as official documentation of his decision to relinquish U.S. citizenship.

A person who performs a potentially expatriating act with the intention of giving up U.S. citizenship loses U.S. citizenship from the time of that act. (Note: In addition to the matters discussed by Berg 2014, the Second Circuit has also held that "Congress sought by the enactment of Section 356 of the Immigration and Nationality Act of 1952, 8 U.S.C. § 1488, to have loss of nationality occur immediately upon the commission of expatriating acts". United States ex. re. Marks v. Esperdy, 315 F.2d 673 (1963). Affirmed by an equally divided Supreme Court: Marks v. Esperdy, 377 U.S. 214 (1964).) The State Department will issue such a person with a Certificate of Loss of Nationality (CLN) upon request. U.S. nationality law does not require an ex-citizen to notify the State Department nor obtain a CLN, but obtaining one may be helpful to prove one's status as a non-U.S. citizen to other governments or private parties, and U.S. tax laws since 2004 ignore relinquishment of citizenship until the person notifies the State Department.

Obtaining a CLN to demonstrate relinquishment of U.S. citizenship has become a lengthy process with high barriers. The total cost of renouncing U.S. citizenship for a person in France, including the cost of preparing the related tax paperwork, has been reported to be € 10 000 – 20 000 on average. Allison Christians of McGill University and Peter Spiro of Temple University have suggested that the complexity and cost of the process, especially the $2350 State Department fee and the potential penalties for failure to file related tax forms, may constitute a breach of the U.S.' obligation not to impose arbitrary barriers to change of nationality, particularly when applied to accidental Americans who have few genuine links to the United States. Such an obligation can be found in municipal law (the Expatriation Act of 1868), in international instruments such as the Universal Declaration of Human Rights, and in general state practice. The difficulty of the process led to a proposal by members of France's National Assembly that the French government should negotiate with the U.S. government for French citizens to enjoy a simplified procedure for renouncing U.S. citizenship that did not require payment of such fees, and subsequently a June 2018 resolution in the European Parliament calling on the European Commission to carry out similar negotiations in respect of all accidental Americans who were citizens of the European Union.

Tax filing is not a legal prerequisite to giving up U.S. citizenship, although there are various negative tax consequences if one fails to file U.S. taxes before giving up citizenship, or fails to file tax forms specific to ex-citizens in the year following relinquishment. The U.S. State Department instructs officers not to answer any inquiries about the tax treatment of ex-citizens, and refers all such inquiries to the IRS.

=== Interview and processing fee ===
Obtaining a CLN by renouncing citizenship requires two interviews by U.S. consular officers; the first interview may be held by telephone, but State Department policy requires that the second must be in person. Obtaining a CLN through other forms of relinquishment, where the individual informs the consulate that he or she had the requisite intent when performing a potentially expatriating act, requires the individual to complete a questionnaire and return it to the consulate, after which the consular officer may request a follow-up interview, either by telephone or in person. In Canada, one of the countries with a high volume of relinquishments of U.S. citizenship, initial intake and review of the questionnaire prior to assignment of an appointment reportedly took 60 days in 2016.

Interviews are normally conducted on an individual basis, but in 2011 the U.S. Consulate in Toronto held a group appointment for twenty-two people in an apparent attempt to address scheduling difficulties. By 2014, backlogs had lengthened, and subsequently the Toronto consulate was reported to have a ten-month waiting list for appointments in 2015, while the U.S. Embassy in Dublin stated in April 2016 that no more appointments were available until December 2016. The appointment does not have to be conducted at the diplomatic post in the relinquisher's country of residence, but can be held at a post in another country instead.

After the second interview, the person signs a statement confirming that they understand the rights they are giving up, and must pay a fee of $2350. The fee was raised from its previous level of $450 in 2014. This fee is believed to be the world's highest for giving up citizenship, more than twice the fee in the next highest country (Jamaica), and roughly twenty times the average fee charged by other developed countries.A new decision has reduced this fee to $450 as of April 13, 2026.

=== Waiting for a Certificate of Loss of Nationality ===
Wait time to receive a CLN varies. Cuban spy René González received his CLN within days of renouncing. Others have reported wait times of as long as a year. The loss of citizenship is deemed to take legal effect on the date of the actual relinquishing act, rather than the date of approval of the CLN. While approval of the CLN is pending, the State Department will not issue a U.S. visa to a person who has relinquished citizenship, meaning that in general the person cannot travel to the United States. In exceptional cases, the State Department says that it can permit a relinquisher with an "urgent need to travel" to the U.S. while the CLN is pending to use a U.S. passport.

Following confirmation by State Department officials in Washington, DC, the consulate provides a copy of the CLN to the former citizen, and returns his or her U.S. passport after cancelling it. The State Department also forwards copies of the CLN to the Federal Bureau of Investigation, the Department of Homeland Security (more specifically Citizenship and Immigration Services), and the Internal Revenue Service.

== Legal elements ==
=== Voluntariness and intent ===
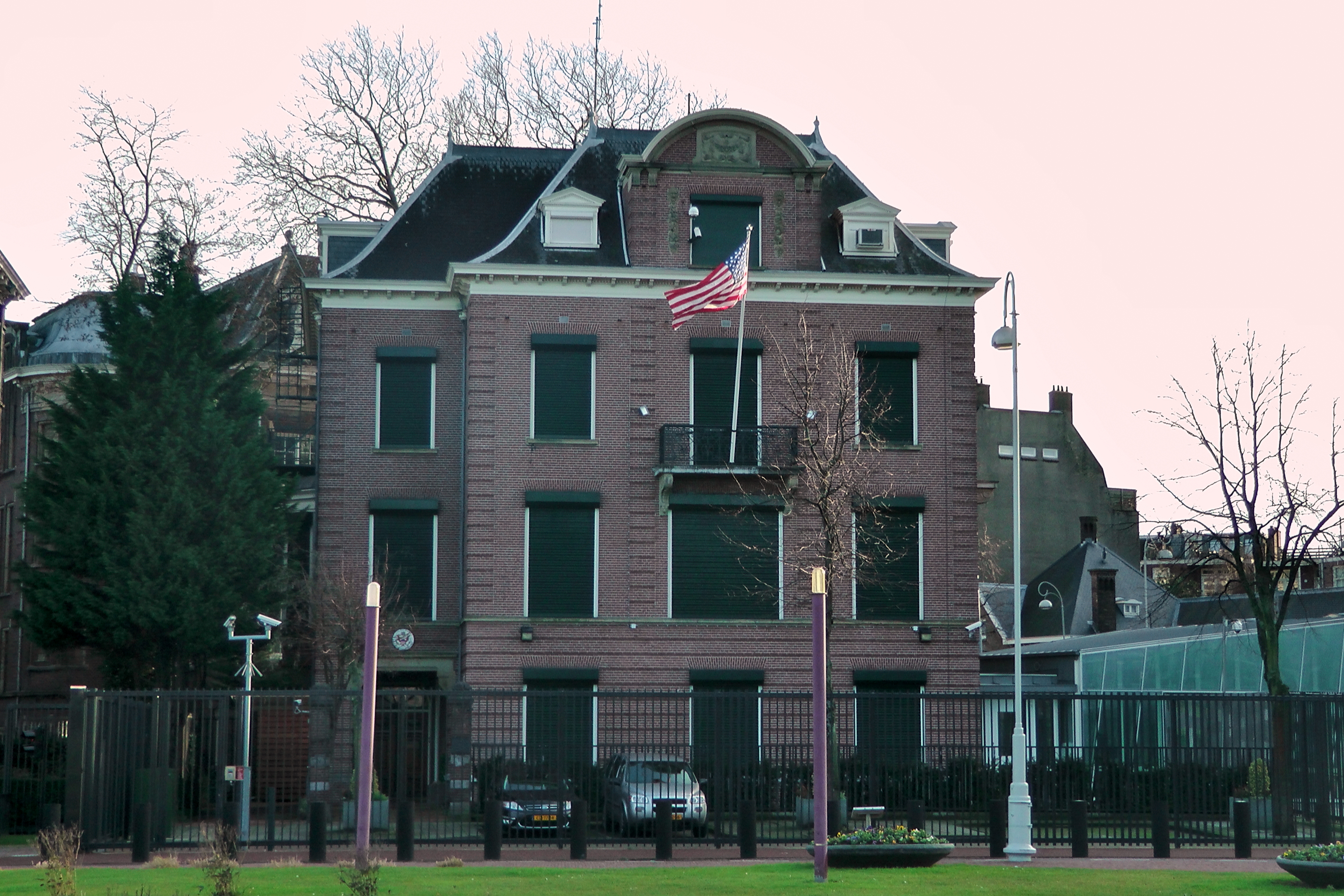
The State Department now requires that a relinquisher seeking to obtain a Certificate of Loss of Nationality attend an in-person interview at a U.S. diplomatic mission abroad, such as the U.S. Consulate in Amsterdam (pictured), to assess the person's intent towards U.S. citizenship.

Beginning with the Expatriation Act of 1907, Congress began to define concrete acts from which the intent to give up citizenship would be inferred, in what Nora Graham describes as the start of "the process of the government transforming voluntary expatriation into denationalization". The constitutional basis for this was not the Naturalization Clause, as Supreme Court dicta limited the scope of this power. Rather, the government successfully argued for decades, beginning in Mackenzie v. Hare, that this arose from the inherent power of sovereignty in foreign relations. The Nationality Act of 1940 greatly expanded the list of acts regarded as criteria for a finding of voluntary expatriation.

The Supreme Court eventually rejected this argument in Afroyim v. Rusk (1967), ruling that under the Fourteenth Amendment, Congress lacked the power to deprive a native-born or naturalized citizen of U.S. citizenship, and that loss of citizenship required the individual's assent. Then in Vance v. Terrazas (1980), the court further clarified that mere performance of expatriating acts could not be taken as "conclusive evidence" of assent to loss of citizenship, but rather that the trier of fact must also find an intent to relinquish citizenship either "in words" or "as fair inference from proven conduct". Finally, in 1990, the State Department adopted an administrative presumption that U.S. citizens who performed three categories of potentially expatriating acts (naturalizing in a foreign state, making a "routine" oath of allegiance to a foreign country, or serving in a non-policy-level position in a foreign government) intended to retain U.S. citizenship, unless the person "affirmatively asserts" otherwise to a consular officer. An attempt in 2005 to force the State Department to revise this policy died in committee in the House of Representatives. (Note: Section 703 of the Enforcement First Immigration Reform Act of 2005 (H.R. 3938), a U.S. immigration reform bill sponsored by J. D. Hayworth (R-AZ-5) and co-sponsored by 33 other Republicans, would have required the State Department to "revise the 1990 memoranda and directives on dual citizenship and dual nationality and return to the traditional policy of the Department of State of viewing dual/multiple citizenship as problematic and as something to be discouraged not encouraged". Section 702 of the same act would have imposed a $10,000 fine and a prison sentence of up to one year on naturalized citizens who had taken the Oath of Allegiance and subsequently voted in an election, ran for elective office, served in any government body, used the passport, took an oath of allegiance, or served in the armed forces of their country of former citizenship. See Gaver, John (December 9, 2005). "Citizenship Reform Torpedoes Immigration Bill". Action America. The House Judiciary Committee referred the bill to its Subcommittee on Immigration and Border Security, while the Armed Services Committee referred the bill to its Subcommittee on Terrorism, Unconventional Threats and Capabilities, but neither took further action on the bill by the end of the 109th Congress' first session.) Cases restricting government-initiated termination of U.S. citizenship were seen as civil rights victories by advocates and people who hoped to regain or retain U.S. citizenship. They have also resulted in involuntary retroactive restoration of U.S. citizenship, without notification, to people who were unwilling to have their citizenship restored.

In general, the Department of Justice takes the position that renunciation pursuant to a plea bargain is voluntary and demonstrates intent to give up U.S. citizenship. However, the Office of Legal Counsel outlined some circumstances under which a court might regard such a renunciation as involuntary, including "physical or mental intimidation", material misrepresentation of the plea agreement, or withholding material evidence. In at least one case prior to 1984, a State Department official refused to certify that a renunciation under such a plea bargain was voluntary.

Some cases from the late 1950s and 1960s held that a potentially expatriating act could not actually cause loss of citizenship absent awareness that one had citizenship. Later case law modulated this: in Breyer v. Meissner (2000), the Third Circuit stated in dicta that voluntary service in the Waffen-SS during World War II would constitute "unequivocal renunciation of American citizenship whether or not the putative citizen [was] then aware that he has a right to American citizenship". (Note: However, the Third Circuit upheld the district court's finding that the Waffen-SS service of plaintiff-appellant Johann Breyer was involuntary and that he had not thus relinquished U.S. citizenship. Breyer v. Meissner, 214 F.3d 416 (3rd Cir. 2000).)

=== Burden of proof and standard of evidence ===
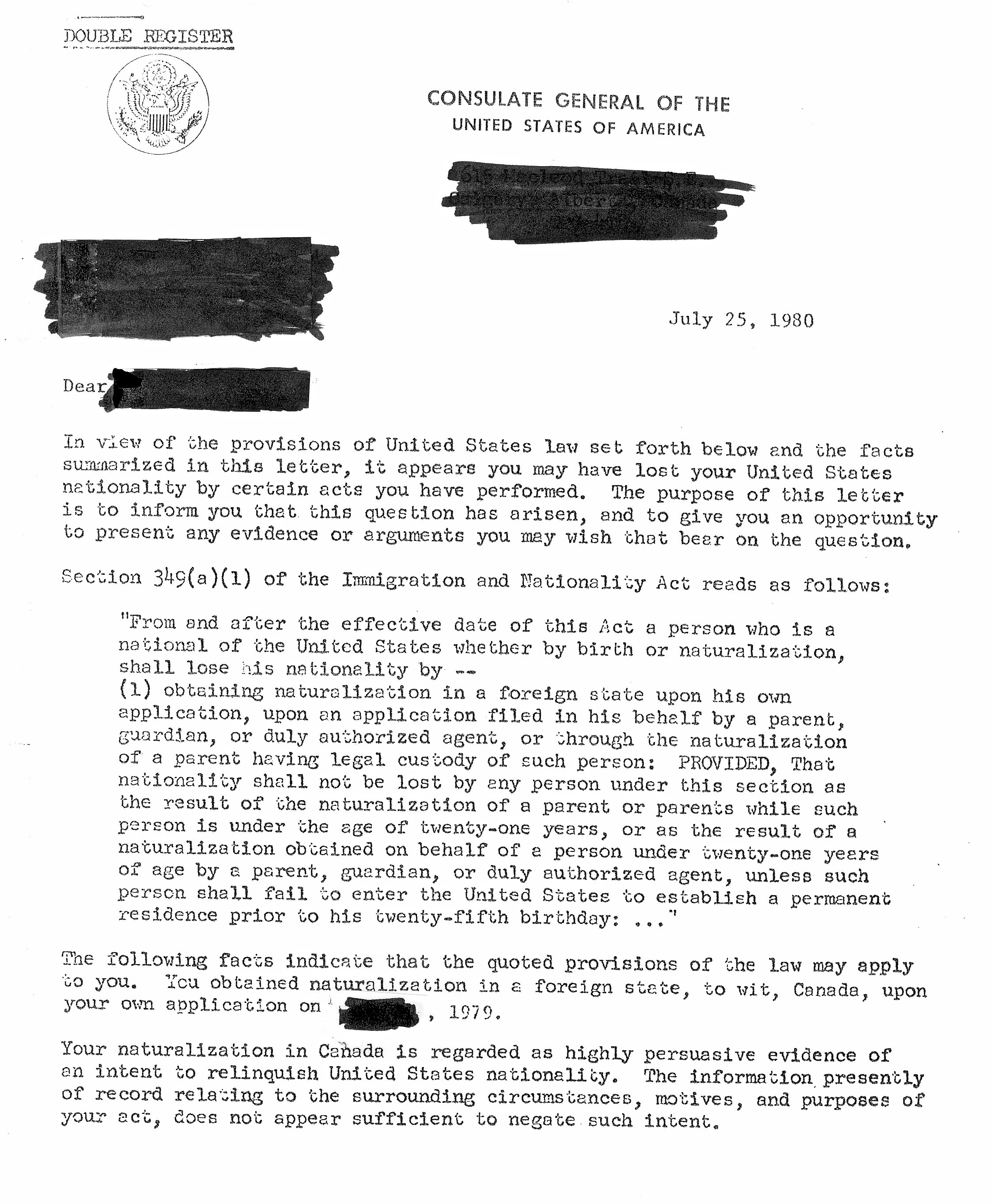
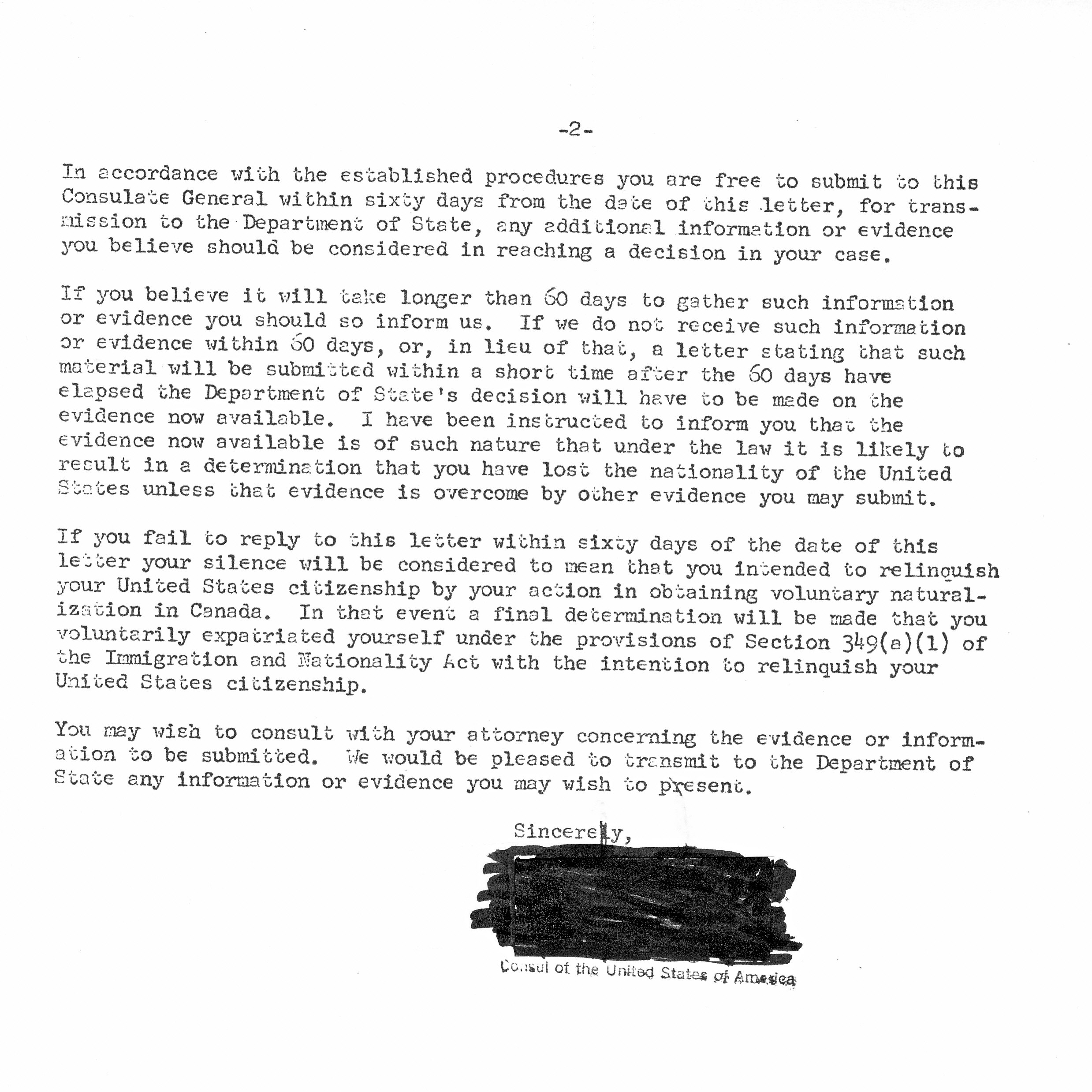
A July 1980 letter from a U.S. consulate to a new Canadian citizen, stating that naturalization in Canada was "highly persuasive evidence" of intent to relinquish U.S. nationality.

8 U.S.C. § 1481(b) places the burden of proof for relinquishment of citizenship "upon the person or party claiming that such loss occurred, to establish such claim by a preponderance of the evidence", and establishes the presumption that a potentially expatriating act was performed voluntarily. Thus, when an individual citizen asserts that it was his or her intent to relinquish citizenship, the burden of proof is on the individual to prove that intent.

This provision, recommended by the House Un-American Activities Committee (HUAC), passed into law in 1961. HUAC chairman Francis E. Walter first introduced bills with this provision in February 1960 and January 1961, and it was eventually inserted into a Senate-originated bill on war orphans in August 1961. The House Judiciary Committee report on that bill stated that the burden of proof "would rest on the Government", whereas HUAC's later annual report noted that the burden of proof was on "the party claiming that such loss occurred". In the committee report on the bill, Walter described this provision as "forestall[ing] further erosion of the statute designed to preserve and uphold the dignity and priceless value of U.S. citizenship with attendant obligations".

The standard of preponderance of the evidence means that "it was more likely than not that the individual intended to relinquish citizenship at the time of the expatriating act"; the intent must be contemporaneous with the act. Prior to the enactment of 1481(b), the Supreme Court had held in Nishikawa v. Dulles that, in the absence of any Congressionally enacted standard of evidence, expatriation cases required the same standard of clear and convincing evidence as in denaturalization cases. Decades after the enactment of 1481(b), the Supreme Court upheld the new standard of evidence in Vance v. Terrazas in January 1980.

=== Abandonment of right of U.S. residence ===
In general, 8 U.S.C. § 1483(a) requires that an individual be outside of the United States and its outlying possessions (Note: American Samoa and Swains Island, per 8 U.S.C. § 1101(a)(29)) in order to relinquish citizenship, except when the relinquishing act is renunciation during a state of war or commission of treason, rebellion, or similar crimes. Additionally, relinquishment of citizenship requires giving up the right to enter and reside in the United States. This does not mean that ex-citizens are banned from the country; the State Department routinely issues visas to ex-citizens. However, aside from limited exceptions for some indigenous peoples of the Americas, (Note: 8 U.S.C. § 1359, based on Article III of the Jay Treaty (1794), acknowledges "the right of American Indians born in Canada to pass the borders of the United States", subject to a 50% blood quantum requirement. 25 U.S.C. § 1300b-13(d) acknowledges a similar right in respect of members of the Texas Band of Kickapoo Indians, whose traditional lands straddle the Mexico–U.S. border. No such provisions are available for members of some other indigenous nations, such as the Tohono O'odham. See Grossman 2018, § 3, and further Heiderpriem, Peter (December 2015). "The Tohono O'odham Nation and the United States–Mexico Border". American Indian Law Journal. 4 (1).) entry into the United States is a privilege for which ex-citizens must apply, rather than a right which they can exercise freely, and they can be denied entry or deported just like any other alien. Though it might be possible that an alien could be a citizen of a U.S. state without obtaining or even being eligible for U.S. citizenship, state citizenship cannot provide any rights to enter or remain in the United States. Pseudo-legal arguments about U.S. citizenship by members of the sovereign citizen movement, such as that a person can declare himself a "free-born citizen of a state" rather than a U.S. citizen and then continue to reside in the U.S. without being subject to federal law, have been found frivolous by courts. Courts have also addressed other assertions of residual rights to U.S. residence by ex-citizens on the basis of sub-national citizenship at least twice in recent years.

Garry Davis, who renounced U.S. citizenship in 1948 at the U.S. Embassy in Paris, attempted to return to the United States in 1978 without a visa, and was granted parole into the U.S. but not legal admission. In an appeal against deportation, he argued that he had only renounced United States citizenship but not the citizenship of the state of Maine where he was born. He further argued that the U.S. Constitution's Privileges and Immunities Clause meant that as a citizen of Maine he could not be denied the privilege of living in New Hampshire which New Hampshire citizens enjoyed. Judge Thomas Aquinas Flannery of the DC District Court did not address the first argument but rejected the second, writing that while the state of New Hampshire could not restrict Davis' travel or access there, under the Constitution's Naturalization Clause Congress has sole and absolute authority to make laws regarding the entry and deportation of people other than United States citizens.

In 1998, the DC District Court considered another case involving a renunciant who returned to the United States without a visa. In the mid-1990s, a number of Puerto Rican independence supporters, including Alberto Lozada Colón and Juan Mari Brás, renounced U.S. citizenship at U.S. embassies in nearby countries and then returned to Puerto Rico almost immediately while they were waiting to receive CLNs. In 1998, the State Department formally refused to issue a CLN to Lozada Colón, stating that his continued assertion of the right to reside in the United States without obtaining a visa demonstrated his lack of intent to relinquish United States citizenship. Lozada Colón petitioned for a writ of mandamus to compel the State Department to issue his CLN, arguing that he could relinquish U.S. citizenship while keeping Puerto Rican citizenship and thus the right to return to his homeland of Puerto Rico. Judge Stanley Sporkin rejected the argument that a non-U.S. citizen had the right to enter Puerto Rico, noting that Puerto Rico was part of the United States for purposes of the Immigration and Nationality Act, and so aliens required documentation from the U.S. government in order to enter and reside there. Sporkin further ruled that the court was not an appropriate venue to decide the political question of whether Puerto Rican citizenship could stand separately from U.S. citizenship. Following the ruling, the State Department also revoked Mari Brás' CLN.

=== Other citizenship recommended but not required ===
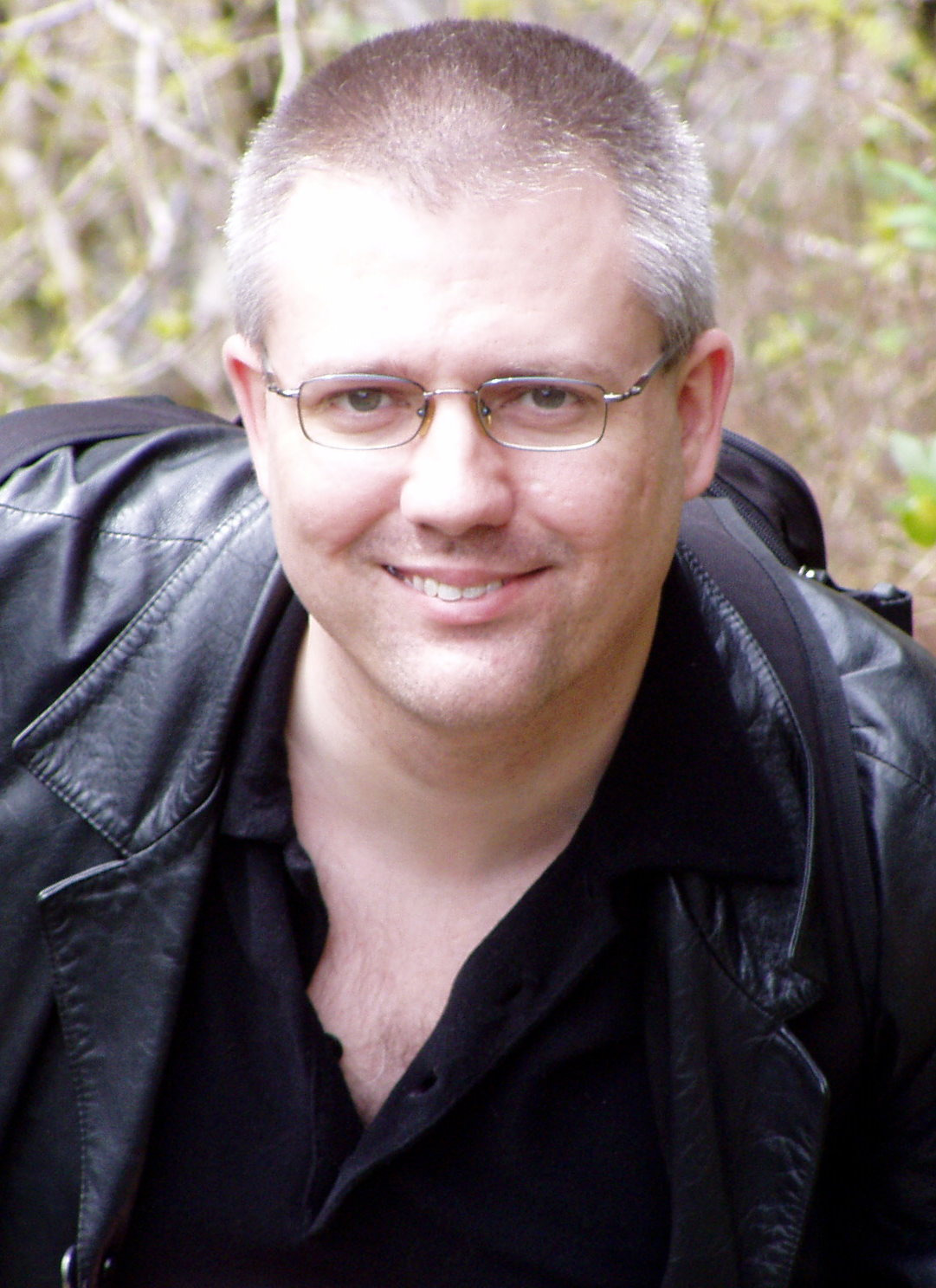
Mike Gogulski voluntarily gave up his U.S. citizenship without acquiring any other.

The United States is not a signatory to either the 1954 Convention relating to the Status of Stateless Persons nor the 1961 Convention on the Reduction of Statelessness. As such, the United States permits citizens to relinquish their citizenship even when those citizens have no other citizenship, without regard to the conventions' attempts to prevent statelessness from occurring as a result of voluntary relinquishment of nationality. The State Department warns that "severe hardship" could result to individuals making themselves stateless, that even those with permanent residence in their country "could encounter difficulties continuing to reside there without a nationality", and that a foreign country might deport stateless ex-U.S. citizens back to the United States. (Note: Regarding in general the obligation for a state to receive back its stateless former nationals in the case that another state seeks to deport them (a duty owed by a state to other states at international public law, rather than an entitlement of the individual under municipal law), see Williams, John Fischer (1927). "Denationalization". The British Yearbook of International Law. 8: 45–61 – via HathiTrust.) However, "[i]n making all these points clear to potentially stateless renunciants, the Department of State will, nevertheless, afford them their right to expatriate."

There are several known cases in which former U.S. citizens made themselves stateless voluntarily. Henry Martyn Noel moved to Allied-occupied Germany in the aftermath of World War II and voluntarily made himself stateless to protest "a climax of nationalism" he saw rising around him in the United States. Thomas Jolley renounced U.S. citizenship in 1967 after acquiring landed immigrant status in Canada (but not citizenship there) in order to avoid being drafted to serve in the Vietnam War. Raffi Hovannisian renounced U.S. citizenship in April 2001 and made himself stateless to protest a decade-long delay in the processing of his application for Armenian citizenship; he was subsequently granted Armenian citizenship by presidential decree about four months later. Garry Davis and Mike Gogulski made themselves stateless because they felt that their respective political philosophies precluded allegiance to any one country.

One case in which a stateless ex-U.S. citizen was deported back to the United States, as warned of by the State Department, was that of Joel Slater. Slater, motivated by opposition to the foreign policy of the Ronald Reagan administration, renounced in Perth, Australia, in 1987. After Australia deported him back to the United States, he subsequently proceeded to Canada en route to the French overseas territory of Saint Pierre and Miquelon, but failed to secure permission to remain there, and was deported from Canada back to the United States as well. In other cases, renunciation of U.S. citizenship forestalled or prevented the stateless individual's deportation. Clare Negrini renounced U.S. citizenship in Italy in 1951 and made herself stateless in an effort to prevent Italy from expelling her back to the United States; she later married an Italian citizen and acquired Italian citizenship through him. Harmon Wilfred renounced U.S. citizenship in New Zealand in 2005 and made himself stateless after Immigration New Zealand (INZ) denied his application for a visa extension to remain in the country. In 2011 INZ ordered Wilfred deported, but the State Department refused to issue travel documents to allow Wilfred entry to the U.S., and in February 2018 INZ withdrew the deportation order against him.

=== No relinquishment by parent or guardian ===
In early U.S. legal history, the Supreme Court recognized the expatriation of a minor by his father's action in Inglis v. Trustees of Sailor's Snug Harbor (1830). In that case, the plaintiff had been born in New York City, but the success of his action to recover real estate turned on the legal question of his citizenship. It was not clear whether he was born before or after the United States Declaration of Independence, but it was common ground that his loyalist father took him to Nova Scotia after the 1783 British evacuation of New York. Justice Smith Thompson, writing the majority opinion, held that the father's action constituted election to be a British subject under the 1783 Treaty of Paris, and that decision extended to the plaintiff as well. (Note: "The facts disclosed in this case, then, lead irresistibly to the conclusion that it was the fixed determination of Charles Inglis the father, at the declaration of independence, to adhere to his native allegiance. And John Inglis the son must be deemed to have followed the condition of his father, and the character of a British subject attached to and fastened on him also, which he has never attempted to throw off by any act disaffirming the choice made for him by his father." Inglis v. Trustees of Sailor's Snug Harbor, 28 U.S. 99 (1830). For information about the harbor itself, see Sailors' Snug Harbor.)

In the early 20th century, the State Department and the Immigration and Naturalization Service clashed on the question of whether parental action could result in loss of citizenship of minor children. Though the Attorney-General favored the State Department's view that it could, in 1939 the Supreme Court held in Perkins v. Elg that a citizen born in the U.S. did not lose her own citizenship when her parents, both naturalized Americans of Swedish origin, returned to Sweden and her father renounced his American citizenship. In the 2010s, the U.S. Consulate in Calgary ruled that Carol Tapanila, an American-born Canadian woman who had renounced her own U.S. citizenship, could not renounce on behalf of her developmentally disabled son; the son was also ruled unable to renounce on his own due to his inability to understand the concept of citizenship or renunciation, thus leaving him permanently subject to U.S. taxation and reporting requirements on gains in his Canadian government-funded Registered Disability Savings Plan.

The statutory definition of some potentially expatriating acts, namely foreign naturalization, foreign oath of allegiance, and foreign government service, requires that the person performing them have been eighteen years or older at the time in order to relinquish citizenship through those acts. There is no statutory age restriction on renunciation before a U.S. diplomatic officer abroad; nevertheless, the State Department often refuses to accept renunciations by minors, and carefully scrutinizes cases involving even individuals who have recently attained the age of majority, on the theory that they may be subject to ongoing influence by their parents.

== Reasons for relinquishing citizenship ==
=== Foreign prohibitions on multiple citizenship ===
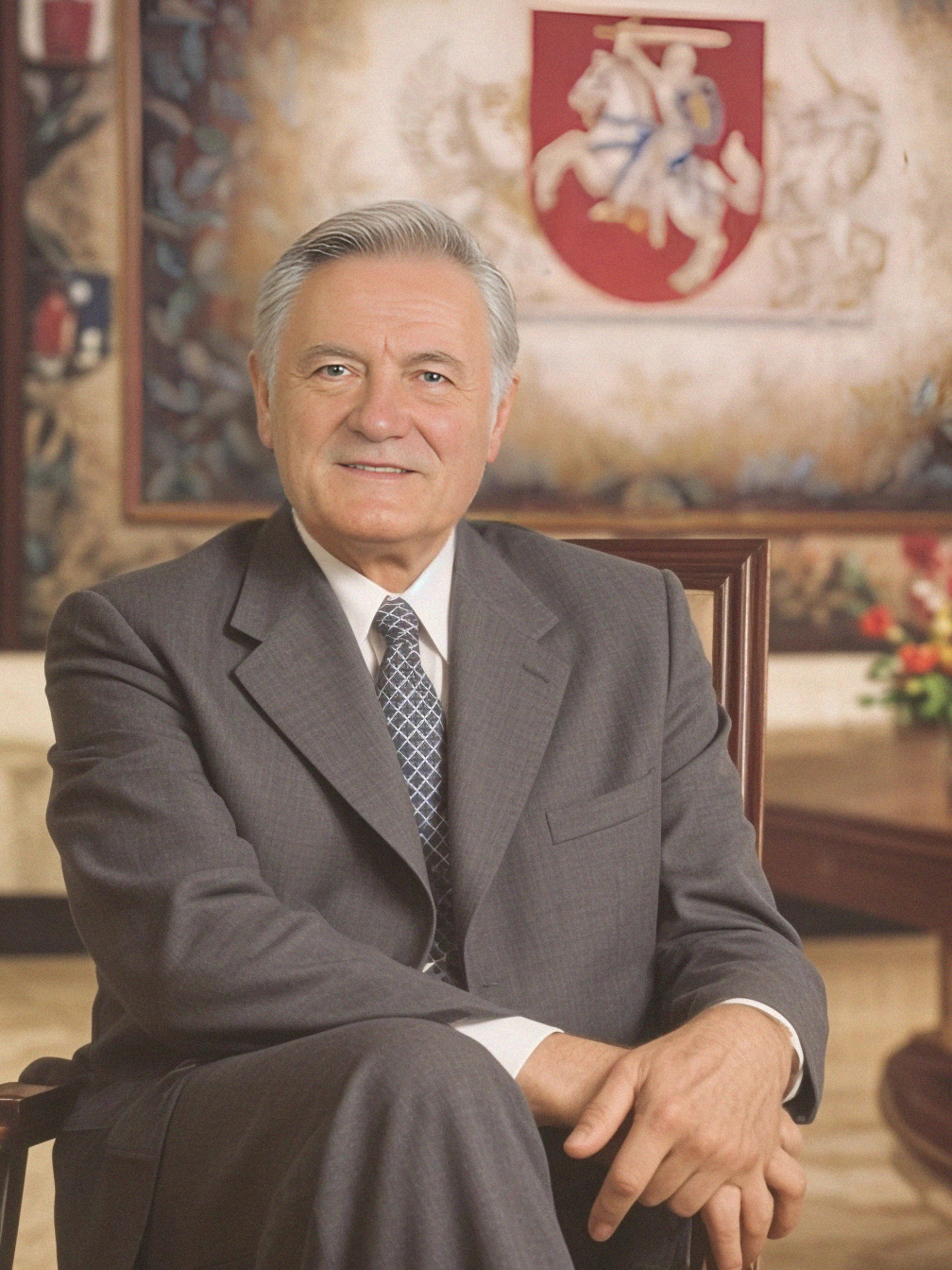
Valdas Adamkus renounced U.S. citizenship to run for president of Lithuania, and was elected to the position twice.

Although the U.S. government has removed most restrictions on dual or multiple citizenship from its nationality laws, some other countries retain such restrictions, and U.S. citizens in such countries may choose to give up U.S. citizenship to comply with those restrictions.

Some foreign countries do not permit their citizens to hold other citizenships at all. Bars on dual citizenship take a variety of forms, but two common provisions in such countries' laws are that a foreigner seeking to become a citizen of the country generally must obtain release from any other citizenships according to the laws of those other countries (a provision seen for example in South Korea and Austria), and that a person who was born with dual citizenship must choose whether to retain the local citizenship or the foreign citizenship upon reaching the age of majority (e.g. in Japan). In the 1990s, a large proportion of individuals relinquishing citizenship were naturalized citizens returning to their countries of birth; for example, the State Department indicated to the JCT that many of the 858 U.S. citizens who renounced in 1994 were former Korean Americans who returned to South Korea and resumed their citizenship there, which under South Korean nationality law required them to give up their U.S. citizenship. By the late 1990s, the number of relinquishments had fallen to about 400 per year. The State Department speculated that the 1997 Asian financial crisis resulted in "fewer people renounc[ing] their U.S. citizenship as a condition of employment in an Asian country".

Even countries which permit dual citizenship may bar dual citizens from government positions. Section 44(i) of the Constitution of Australia for example forbids dual citizens to stand for election to Parliament, while Article 28 of Taiwan's Public Servants Employment Act bars dual citizens from most public-sector positions. Diplomatic and consular positions present additional difficulties. The Vienna Convention on Diplomatic Relations and Vienna Convention on Consular Relations state that a country may refuse to receive a diplomat or consular officer who holds the citizenship of the receiving country. Based on this, the State Department does not receive U.S. citizens and non-citizen nationals as diplomats representing a foreign country to the United States. The State Department permits such individuals to represent a foreign country in its diplomatic mission at United Nations Headquarters in New York City, but while in such positions they enjoy only official acts immunity and not diplomatic immunity. Thus, an individual wishing to assume a diplomatic or consular position in the United States may choose to relinquish U.S. citizenship. One early example of this, which was described at the time as the first such case in U.S. diplomatic history, was Oskar R. Lange's decision to renounce citizenship in 1945 to become the Polish ambassador to the United States.

=== Tax compliance difficulties for U.S. citizens abroad ===
Systems of taxation on personal income No income tax on individuals Territorial Residential Citizenship-based

The United States is the only country which taxes the foreign income of citizens residing abroad permanently. (Note: Eritrea, which is frequently mentioned as another country practicing "citizenship-based taxation", requires citizens abroad to fill out a one-page form and pay a 2% reconstruction tax. Both proponents and detractors of the U.S. system agree that it is not analogous to the Eritrean system, e.g. Kirsch 2014 and Spiro 2017. Reports that China practices citizenship-based taxation are incorrect; see Johnston, Stephanie Soong (January 22, 2015). "Experts Question Accuracy of New York Times Story on Chinese Taxation". Tax Analysts.) The United States first imposed taxes on overseas citizens during the Civil War, and has done so continuously since the Revenue Act of 1913. During that period, the small number of other countries with similar practices all repealed such laws and moved to taxing based on residence, (Note: Most recently Vietnam in 2007 and Myanmar in 2012. "Vietnam: Law on Personal Income Tax". Global Legal Monitor. Library of Congress. April 2, 2008. Roughneen, Simon (January 10, 2012). "Burmese Abroad Welcome Tax Break, but More Reforms Needed". The Irrawaddy.) to the extent that residence-based taxation might now be regarded as a norm of customary international law; Allison Christians has stated that the U.S. might be regarded as a persistent objector to the emergence of this new norm, though she notes that the U.S.' sporadic efforts to enforce its system over the years in which this norm formed might not rise to the level of "persistent".

The U.S. foreign tax credit and Foreign Earned Income Exclusion reduce double taxation but do not eliminate it even for people whose income is well below the exclusion threshold, particularly in the case of self-employment tax. The treatment of foreign-currency loans can result in U.S. income tax owed even when there has been no income in real terms, which causes difficulties for those who obtained a mortgage to purchase a home in their country of residence. (Note: Specifically, U.S. citizens, unlike businesses, are required to use the United States dollar as their functional currency. If the U.S. dollar has gone up in value, repayment of the foreign-currency loan creates income from cancellation of debt, because in U.S. dollar terms the initial amount of indebtedness is greater than the value of the depreciated foreign currency used to pay back the loan. "When buying a home is a forex transaction". Hodgen Law: International Tax. Hodgen Law PC. May 29, 2015. Furthermore, U.S. citizens, unlike businesses, are not allowed to use 26 U.S.C. § 988(d)(1) to net gains on foreign-currency loans with capital losses on assets acquired with those loans. Quijano v. United States, 93 F.3d 26 (1st Cir. 1996).) Foreign government-sponsored savings plans or structures may face complicated reporting requirements under United States anti-offshoring laws; for example the Canadian Registered Disability Savings Plan may be a foreign trust for U.S. tax purposes, while non-US mutual funds may be Passive Foreign Investment Companies. The forms for reporting such assets are time-consuming to complete, often requiring expensive professional assistance, and penalties of $10,000 per form can be imposed for failure to file. (Note: For example, Form 3520, required for foreign savings plans classified as trusts by U.S. tax law as mentioned above, has a total time burden of 54 hours (including the time for recordkeeping, learning about the law or form, and preparing the form), according to estimates made by the IRS under the Paperwork Reduction Act, and has a minimum penalty of $10,000 for incomplete or incorrect filing. "Instructions for Form 3520: Annual Return To Report Transactions With Foreign Trusts and Receipt of Certain Foreign Gifts" (PDF). Internal Revenue Service. October 25, 2016. pp. 2, 14. Archived from the original (PDF) on April 30, 2017. For further details, see Mitchel, Andrew (November 2, 2015). "The Escalation of Offshore Penalties Over the Last 20 Years". International Tax Blog.) Furthermore, the Foreign Account Tax Compliance Act (FATCA) imposed additional compliance burdens on non-U.S. banks, making them increasingly unwilling to extend anything beyond basic banking services to customers with U.S. citizenship. One scholar described the sum total of these requirements as "an attack on ordre public".

The rise in relinquishments in the 2010s appears to have been driven by increased awareness of the tax and reporting burdens on U.S. citizens in other countries; in particular, many relinquishers are believed to be accidental Americans who only learned about their citizenship and these burdens due to enforcement of and publicity about FATCA. Some legal scholars interpret the number of U.S. citizenship relinquishers as indicating acceptance of the tax and reporting burdens by those who do not relinquish. Others believe that the number of people giving up citizenship remains small only because some de jure dual citizens, particularly those born abroad, remain unaware of their status or are able to hide from the U.S. government more effectively than those born in the United States. In 2024, a new U.S. non-profit, non-partisan organization called Tax Fairness for Americans Abroad was created specifically to lobby the U.S. Congress to relieve long-term U.S. non-resident citizens of the obligation to declare non-U.S.-source income and financial accounts to the U.S. government.

=== U.S. military service ===
In 1972, one commentator described Selective Service registration and military service as the "primary obligation" of U.S. citizen men living abroad, aside from taxation. In a 1995 report, the Joint Committee on Taxation attributed the high number of people who gave up U.S. citizenship in the 1960s and 1970s to the Vietnam War.

=== Other reasons ===
Other individual ex-citizens have expressed a variety of reasons for giving up U.S. citizenship.

Vincent Cate, an encryption expert living in Anguilla, chose to renounce his U.S. citizenship in 1998 to avoid the possibility of violating U.S. laws that may have prohibited U.S. citizens from "exporting" encryption software.

Some individuals have given up U.S. citizenship as part of plea bargains, in order to receive reduced penalties for certain crimes. Examples include Arthur Rudolph and Yaser Esam Hamdi. The State Department notes that "some would liken [this] to banishment when a citizen at birth is involved".

== Relinquishing acts since 1978 ==
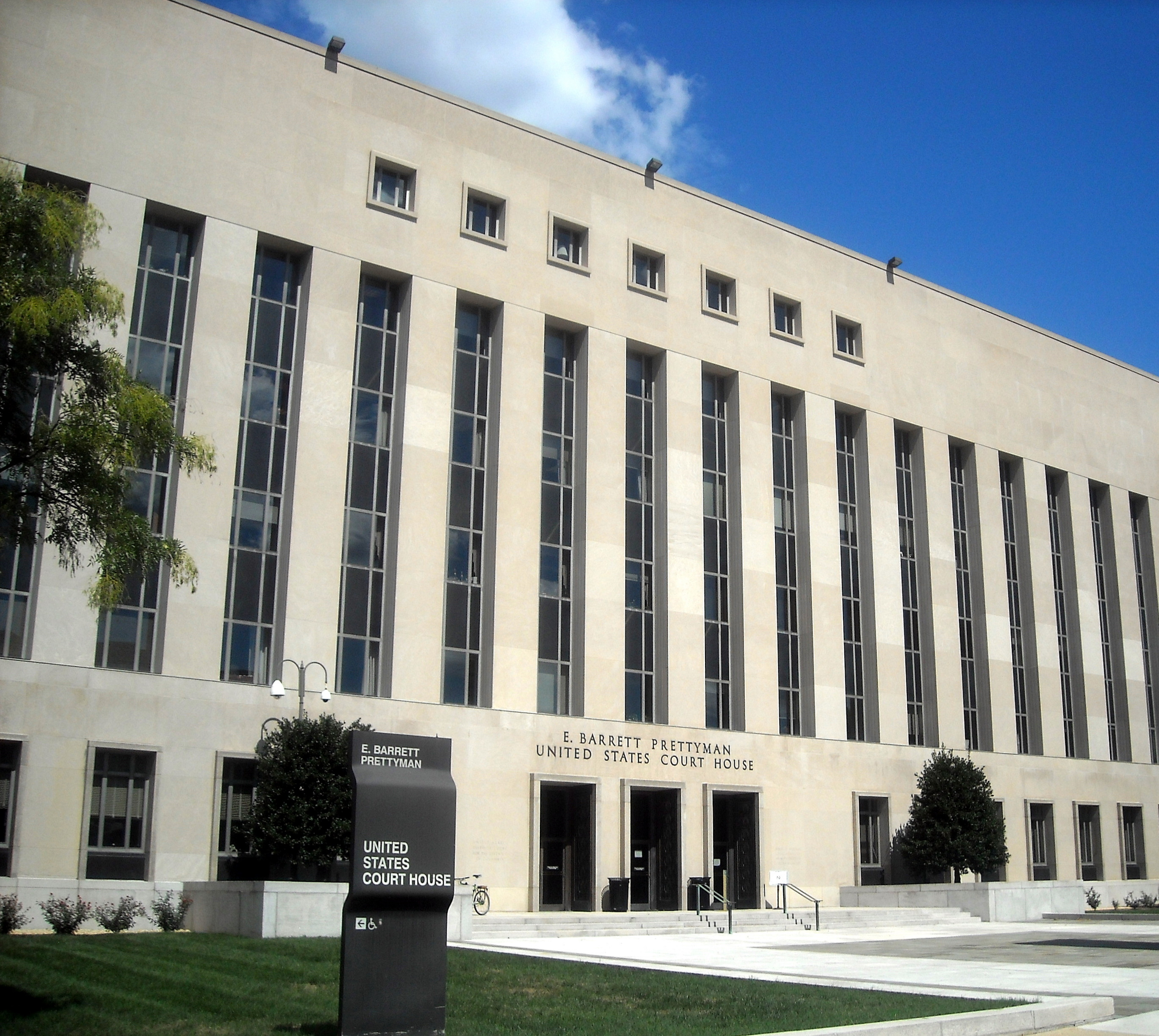
Litigation about relinquishing acts typically takes place in the E. Barrett Prettyman United States Courthouse, where the DC District Court and the DC Circuit Court sit.

U.S. law explicitly lists the acts by which one may relinquish U.S. citizenship at 8 U.S.C. § 1481(a), and previously in other sections of the same subchapter. The list itself was last amended in 1978 to delete the provisions on loss of citizenship for draft evasion, desertion, failure to reside in the United States by naturalized citizens, voting in foreign elections, and failure to reside in the United States by citizens born abroad. The former four had already been struck down by the Supreme Court a decade earlier or more in Trop v. Dulles (1958), Kennedy v. Mendoza-Martinez (1963), Schneider v. Rusk (1964), and Afroyim v. Rusk (1967). The final provision had been upheld in Rogers v. Bellei (1971), but the State Department favored its repeal. The conditions for relinquishment under some potentially expatriating acts were modified by the Immigration and Nationality Act Amendments of 1986, which also inserted the general requirement of "intention to relinquish" in conformance with the Supreme Court's ruling in Vance v. Terrazas (1980). The last amendment to this section was contained in the Immigration Technical Corrections Act of 1988, which extended the requirement of intention to relinquishing acts prior to the effective date of the 1986 amendments.

=== Naturalization in a foreign country ===
8 U.S.C. § 1481(a)(1) provides for relinquishment through "obtaining naturalization in a foreign state upon his own application or upon an application filed by a duly authorized agent". The U.S. government did not recognize unequivocally that a U.S. citizen could choose to give up citizenship by becoming a citizen of a foreign country until the passage of the Expatriation Act of 1868, and instead treated them as continuing to be U.S. citizens regardless of their intent, for example in the Supreme Court case Talbot v. Jansen (1795). Beginning in 1868, the State Department regarded foreign naturalization as affecting expatriation in nearly all cases, again without regard to the citizen's intent.

The State Department continued to regard foreign naturalization as demonstrating intent to relinquish U.S. citizenship even after Vance v. Terrazas. As late as 1985, in Richards v. Secretary of State, the Ninth Circuit upheld a State Department finding of expatriation against a man who had naturalized in Canada, despite his protests that he did not wish to give up U.S. citizenship and that he had only naturalized in order to keep his job with Scouts Canada. Similar rulings by the State Department's Board of Appellate Review can be found as late as March 1990. This policy ended in April 1990, when the State Department began applying a presumption of intent to retain U.S. citizenship to most potentially expatriating acts, including naturalization in a foreign country.

The State Department used to assert that acquisition of Israeli citizenship by operation of the Law of Return after moving to Israel on an oleh's visa could not trigger loss of citizenship under 1481(a)(1) even if the citizen stated that it was his or her intent to relinquish. In Fox v. Clinton (2012), the plaintiff challenged this policy and won recognition of his relinquishment on appeal to the DC Circuit Court.

=== Oath of allegiance to a foreign country ===
8 U.S.C. § 1481(a)(2) provides for relinquishment through "taking an oath or making an affirmation or other formal declaration of allegiance to a foreign state or a political subdivision thereof". This provision was first found in Section 2 of the Expatriation Act of 1907, and was re-enacted in Section 401(b) of the Nationality Act of 1940.

In various cases before the Board of Immigration Appeals up to 1950, oaths which were held as not establishing expatriation included an oath required for employment by a Canadian government-owned airline, an ordination oath in the Church of England, and an admission oath in the German Bar Association. State Department officials also held that the oath should be required by the laws of the foreign state and sworn before an officer of its government. In Gillars v. United States (1950), an appeal in the treason trial of Mildred Gillars, the DC Circuit Court rejected Gillars' contention that a letter she signed in the aftermath of a workplace dispute expressing allegiance to Germany resulted in her expatriation because it was informal in nature, not signed before any German government official, and not connected to German regulations or legal procedures. In the 1950s and 1960s, courts rejected government contentions that individuals had expatriated themselves by subscribing to the oath of allegiance on the application form for a Philippine passport, or making the statement of allegiance to King George V contained in the oath of admission to the Canadian Bar Association. Finally, in Vance v. Terrazas (1980), the Supreme Court held that even when an oath sworn to a foreign government contains language specifically renouncing allegiance to the United States, the government cannot use the oath itself as evidence of intent to relinquish citizenship, but must establish such intent independently.

In 2017, the State Department added four criteria to the Foreign Affairs Manual regarding what would be considered a "meaningful oath" for purposes of this provision. The fourth criterion required that "making and receipt of the oath or affirmation alters the affiant’s legal status with respect to the foreign state", giving the example that a citizen of a foreign country could not expatriate him or herself by taking an oath of allegiance to that same country, unless the oath gave the person a "new citizenship status ... such as a retention of citizenship that might otherwise be lost".

=== Serving in a foreign military ===
8 U.S.C. § 1481(a)(3) provides for relinquishment through "entering, or serving in, the armed forces of a foreign state" if either the person serves "as a commissioned or non-commissioned officer" or "such armed forces are engaged in hostilities against the United States". 1481(a)(3) does not require that the person have attained the age of eighteen years. The State Department's 1990 presumption of intent to retain U.S. citizenship does not apply to service in the military of a foreign country engaged in hostilities against the United States.

When the Supreme Court considered the Nationality Act of 1940's predecessor to this provision in Nishikawa v. Dulles (1958), the majority struck down the government's contention that plaintiff-appellant Mitsugi Nishikawa's service in the Imperial Japanese Army during WWII could serve to effect his expatriation under this provision, because he had been conscripted. The minority objected that by the time the provision had been written, "conscription and not voluntary enlistment had become the usual method of raising armies throughout the world, and it can hardly be doubted that Congress was aware of this fact."

=== Serving in a foreign government ===
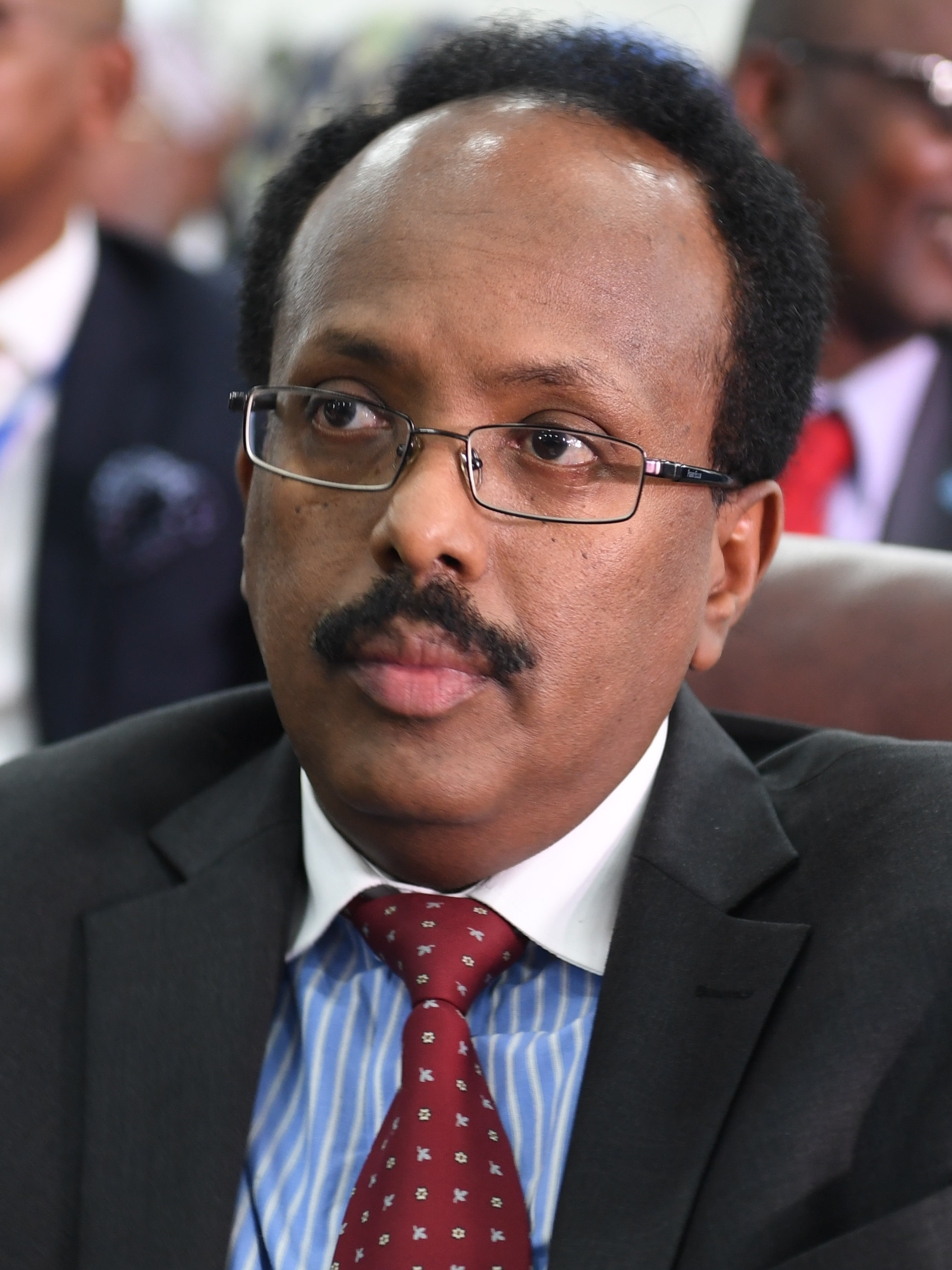
Mohamed Abdullahi Mohamed kept U.S. citizenship during his term as prime minister of Somalia but renounced it two years after being elected president.

8 U.S.C. § 1481(a)(4) provides for relinquishment through "accepting, serving in, or performing the duties of any office, post, or employment under the government of a foreign state or political subdivision thereof", if the person "has or acquires the nationality of such foreign state" or "if an oath, affirmation, or declaration of allegiance is required".

Though the State Department's 1990 presumption of intent to retain U.S. citizenship applies only to non-policy-level employment in a foreign government, even policy-level employment typically does not result in loss of citizenship if the individual says that he or she did not intend to give up citizenship. However, the State Department has expressed some reservations whether serving as a foreign head of state, head of government, or minister of foreign affairs is compatible with maintaining United States citizenship, due to the absolute immunity from U.S. jurisdiction which individuals in such positions should enjoy at customary international law. One case in which the State Department made an ex post facto finding that a foreign head of government had previously relinquished US citizenship was that of Grenadian prime minister Keith Mitchell, who was determined in October 2001 to have relinquished citizenship as of June 1995. Mohamed Abdullahi Mohamed retained his U.S. citizenship during his whole term as prime minister of Somalia in 2010 and the first two years of his term as president of Somalia beginning in 2017; during his term as president, he avoided traveling to the U.S. for diplomatic functions such as the general debates of the 72nd and 73rd sessions of the United Nations General Assembly, in what some Somali news reports stated was an attempt to avoid any issues of immunity that might arise, and he then renounced U.S. citizenship in mid-2019.

Under the respective Compacts of Free Association, service with the governments of the Marshall Islands, the Federated States of Micronesia, or Palau is not an expatriating act.

=== Renunciation at a U.S. diplomatic mission abroad ===
8 U.S.C. § 1481(a)(5) provides for renunciation "before a diplomatic or consular officer of the United States in a foreign state, in such form as may be prescribed by the Secretary of State". The text of the oath is found in Form DS-4080. The 1990 presumption of intent to retain U.S. citizenship does not apply to swearing an oath of renunciation before a U.S. diplomatic officer. The State Department describes renunciation as "the most unequivocal way in which someone can manifest an intention to relinquish U.S. citizenship". A major legal distinction between renunciation and other forms of relinquishment is that "[i]t is much more difficult to establish a lack of intent or duress for renunciation".

A large-scale case in which renunciations of U.S. citizenship were later overturned was that of the African Hebrew Israelites of Jerusalem. In the early 1980s, at least 700 members of the community who had settled in Israel renounced their U.S. citizenship in the hopes that statelessness would prevent their deportation back to the United States, though their children tended to retain citizenship. Groups of four to six per week came to the U.S. Embassy in Tel Aviv to renounce citizenship, over a period of years. Around 1990, the community began negotiating with the Israeli government in an effort to regularize their immigration status; one condition of the mass grant of residence permits was for the community members to re-acquire U.S. citizenship, so that the small number of criminals who had tried to hide in their community could be deported back to the United States. The State Department accepted community leaders' argument that the earlier renunciations had been made under duress due to the social and political environment at the time, and were thus involuntary and did not meet the legal requirements to terminate citizenship.

=== Renunciation within U.S. territory ===
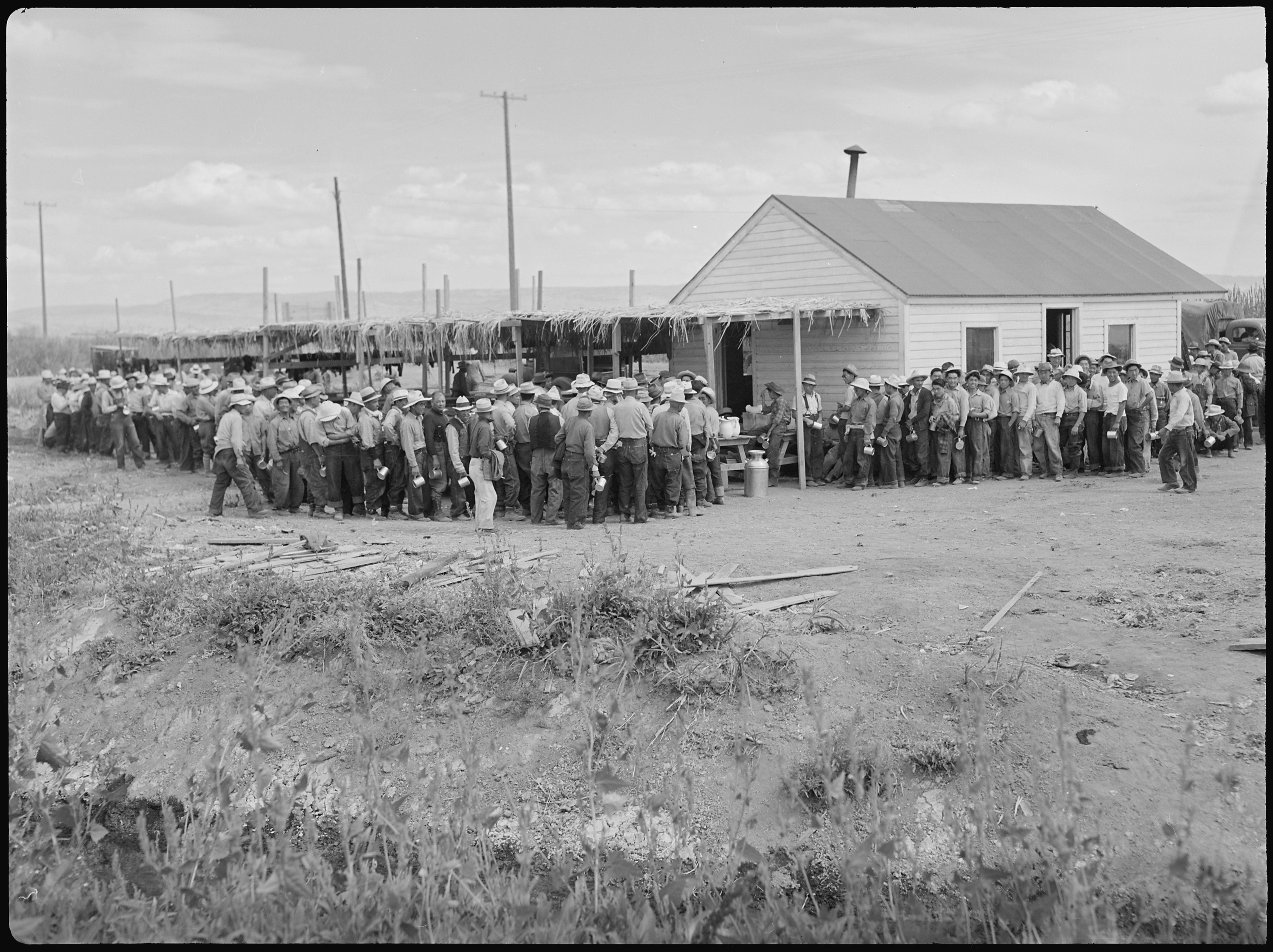
Thousands of Japanese Americans at the Tule Lake internment camp (pictured) renounced U.S. citizenship in 1944 and 1945.

8 U.S.C. § 1481(a)(6) provides for renunciation from within U.S. territory "in such form as may be prescribed by, and before such officer as may be designated by, the Attorney General, whenever the United States shall be in a state of war and the Attorney General shall approve such renunciation as not contrary to the interests of national defense". It was intended to encourage militants among Japanese American internees to renounce U.S. citizenship so that they could continue to be detained if internment were to be declared unconstitutional. About five thousand individuals, mostly at Tule Lake, renounced citizenship for a variety of reasons, including anger at the U.S. government for the internment and the desire to remain with non-citizen family members whom they feared would be deported to Japan. After the war, civil rights lawyer Wayne M. Collins helped many fight legal battles in the courts to regain their citizenship, while some such as Joseph Kurihara accepted deportation to Japan and lived out the rest of their lives there.

1481(a)(6) became inoperative after World War II, and was thought to have remained so during the Vietnam War. There were later some pro se lawsuits regarding 1481(a)(6) due to what Judge Bernice B. Donald derided as a "popular myth among prisoners" that renouncing citizenship would allow early release in exchange for deportation to another country. Courts consistently ruled that 1481(a)(6) was inoperative because the U.S. was not in a "state of war", until 2008 when James Kaufman of Wisconsin won a ruling from the DC District Court that the U.S. was indeed in a "state of war" and that the Department of Homeland Security was responsible for administering 1481(a)(6). The Department of Justice abandoned its appeal against this ruling for unstated reasons. Further attempts by prisoners to renounce under 1481(a)(6) continued to be stymied by a United States Citizenship and Immigration Services policy that applicants had to attend an in-person interview and demonstrate that they could leave the U.S. immediately upon approval of renunciation. By 2018, Kaufman had been released from prison but remained unable to renounce due to the second requirement, though on appeal, the D.C. Circuit found that USCIS was incorrect as a matter of law to conclude, from Kaufman's failure to establish foreign residency or citizenship prior to his attempt at renunciation, that Kaufman lacked the requisite intent to renounce citizenship.

=== Treason, rebellion, or similar crimes ===
8 U.S.C. § 1481(a)(7) provides that commission of certain crimes may be regarded as a relinquishing act, if one is convicted of those crimes. The original list in Section 349(a)(9) of the Immigration and Nationality Act of 1952 included only treason, bearing arms against the U.S., or attempting to overthrow the U.S. by force. The Expatriation Act of 1954, motivated by fears of communism in the United States, added additional crimes to this list, namely the crime of advocating the overthrow of the U.S. government as defined by the Smith Act of 1940, as well as the crimes of seditious conspiracy and rebellion or insurrection as proscribed by the Crimes Act of 1909. This provision is known to have been applied to Tomoya Kawakita, whose conviction for treason was upheld by the Supreme Court in Kawakita v. United States (1952). Kawakita had his death sentence commuted to life imprisonment in 1953, and in 1963 received a conditional pardon in exchange for his deportation to Japan. As of 1991, the constitutionality of this provision had not been tested in the courts. In the 2000s and 2010s, there were proposals to add additional terrorism-related crimes to the list of those causing loss of citizenship, such as the Enemy Expatriation Act in 2011, but these failed to pass.

== Legal treatment of former citizens ==
=== Taxation ===
Special tax provisions began targeting former U.S. citizens in the 1960s. The Foreign Investors Tax Act of 1966, which provided that foreigners who invested in the United States would not have to pay capital gains tax, denied this tax break to people who had relinquished U.S. citizenship within the past ten years and whom the IRS determined to have relinquished for the purpose of avoiding U.S. taxation. This was intended to ensure that U.S. citizens did not relinquish citizenship for the purpose of accessing those tax breaks.

These provisions were rarely enforced due to their vagueness. In the early 1990s an article in Forbes magazine sparked renewed public interest in the issue of wealthy individuals giving up citizenship in order to avoid U.S. taxation, who were estimated to make up roughly a dozen of the one thousand individuals per year giving up U.S. citizenship. As a result, the Health Insurance Portability and Accountability Act of 1996 (HIPAA) enacted concrete criteria under which an ex-citizen would be presumed a "covered expatriate" who gave up U.S. status for tax reasons, based on the person's income and assets, (26 U.S.C. § 877(a)(2)), and required such citizens to file additional tax forms to certify their compliance with the new provisions (26 U.S.C. § 6039G). Dual citizens at birth and young people who relinquished citizenship before the age of 18½ were exempt from "covered expatriate" status, subject to some restrictions including limited physical presence in the United States. (Note: 26 U.S.C. § 877(a)(2). In both cases, this exemption was conditional on not being present in the U.S. "for more than 30 days during any calendar year which is 1 of the 10 calendar years preceding the individual’s loss of United States citizenship". Additionally, a dual citizen had to meet the requirement that he or she "was never a resident of the United States" and "has never held a United States passport", while a young person relinquishing within six months of their 18th birthday would only be exempted from covered expatriate status if "neither parent of such individual was a citizen of the United States" at the time of the person's birth.) The law also extended the expatriation tax to cover ex-permanent residents as well.

Discretionary exceptions to this tax, in particular the system of obtaining a private letter ruling (PLR) that one's relinquishment of citizenship was not motivated by taxation, fueled perceptions that it was ineffective at addressing tax-motivated relinquishment of citizenship, and sparked further amendments in the 2000s. The American Jobs Creation Act of 2004 terminated the PLR exception to the tax on covered expatriates and taxed those who stayed in the U.S. for more than thirty days in any of the first ten years following relinquishment as though they remained a U.S. citizen for that year, while also classifying as "covered expatriates" people who relinquished citizenship or permanent residence but could not certify compliance with their tax filing and payment obligations for the past five years. Then, the Heroes Earnings Assistance Relief Tax Act (HEART Act) of 2008 repealed the ten-year system and imposed new taxes relating to covered expatriates, consisting of a one-time tax on worldwide accrued capital gains, calculated on a mark-to-market basis, and an inheritance tax on bequests from covered expatriates to U.S. persons (equivalent to estate tax with the exemption amount drastically lowered from $5.5 million to $13,000). The HEART Act also modified the criteria for dual citizens and people below the age of 18½ to be exempted from "covered expatriate" status. (Note: For dual citizens, 26 U.S.C. § 877A(g)(1)(B) adds the requires that the individual "is taxed as a resident of" the other country of citizenship, but does not require that the individual "has never held a United States passport". It also loosened the limits on residence in the U.S. compared to 877(a)(2), allowing an individual to qualify for the exemption from covered expatriate status if he or she "has been a resident of the United States ... for not more than 10 taxable years" within a certain period prior to the expatriation date.) The new certification requirement to avoid covered expatriate status means that even the poorest individuals renouncing citizenship could become subject to these taxes. As a result, though tax filing is not a legal prerequisite to relinquishment of citizenship, this new exit tax system imposed significant disadvantages on people who relinquished citizenship without filing taxes.

=== Publication of names ===
In addition to the tax law changes, HIPAA included a provision to make the names of people who give up U.S. citizenship part of the public record by listing them in the Federal Register. The sponsor of this provision, Sam Gibbons (D-FL), stated that it was intended to "name and shame" the people in question. The list contains numerous errors and does not appear to report the names of all people who give up U.S. citizenship, though tax lawyers disagree whether that is because the list is only required to contain "covered expatriates", or due to unintentional omissions or other reasons. Other countries such as Vietnam and South Korea also have provisions requiring publication of renunciation decisions in their respective government gazettes.

=== Visas ===
Two provisions of U.S. immigration law make some former citizens inadmissible, though only a small number of people are actually found inadmissible under those provisions each year. A finding of inadmissibility prevents a person from entering the U.S. either temporarily (under the Visa Waiver Program or a visitor or other visa) or permanently (as a lawful permanent resident), unless the person obtains a Waiver of Inadmissibility.

The Reed Amendment (8 U.S.C. § 1182(a)(10)(E)), which became law as part of the Illegal Immigration Reform and Immigrant Responsibility Act of 1996, attempted to make people who had renounced citizenship for the purpose of avoiding taxation by the United States inadmissible. The Department of Homeland Security indicated in a 2015 report that, due to laws protecting the privacy of tax information, the provision was effectively impossible to enforce unless the former citizen "affirmatively admits" his or her reasons for renouncing citizenship to an official at DHS or the State Department. Bipartisan efforts in the 2000s and 2010s to amend the tax information privacy laws to address this limitation all failed. According to the State Department, no person was denied a U.S. visa due to inadmissibility under the Reed Amendment until Fiscal Years 2016 and 2017, in which a total of three visa applications were denied due to a finding of inadmissibility. In two of those cases, the applicant was able to overcome the finding of inadmissibility and obtain a visa.

Another provision (8 U.S.C. § 1182(a)(8)(B)) makes inadmissible anyone who left the U.S. "to avoid or evade training or service in the armed forces" during a war or national emergency. The State Department regards a conviction as unnecessary for a finding of inadmissibility under this provision. Only people who were U.S. citizens or lawful permanent residents upon their departure are ineligible for non-immigrant visas under this provision. President Carter's 1977 pardon means that this provision is not applied to Vietnam War draft evaders. The State Department interprets the pardon as not applying to deserters. From 2000 to 2014, 120 people were found ineligible for non-immigrant visas under this provision, among whom 83 were able to overcome this ineligibility.

=== Regaining citizenship through naturalization ===
There is no specific provision of law which prevents a person who relinquished U.S. citizenship from regaining it again through naturalization, though conversely such individuals enjoy no special provisions to make the process easier either. They generally must qualify for lawful permanent resident (LPR) immigration status through the same process as any other alien, and must comply with the same requirements for naturalization. Special exceptions apply to women who lost citizenship under the Expatriation Act of 1907 by marrying a non-citizen, and to people who lost citizenship through service in Allied armed forces during World War II: such people can obtain special LPR status (under SC-1 and SC-2 visas) and apply for renaturalization without any required period of residence. The State Department has not issued any SC-1 or SC-2 visas at least since 2000.

Levi Ying stated that the process of regaining U.S. citizenship through naturalization was not very difficult. Ying, a Taiwanese American lawyer who renounced U.S. citizenship to take political office in Taiwan, subsequently re-immigrated to the United States on a petition by his wife (who had remained a U.S. citizen), and applied for naturalization again for the sake of convenience. In contrast, some former Korean Americans who renounced U.S. citizenship to go into politics in South Korea, including Chris Nam and Chang Sung-gill, stated that while they were able to regain LPR status in the U.S. easily through sponsorship by spouses or children who had retained U.S. citizenship, they faced difficulties in the naturalization process.

=== Firearms and explosives ===
One provision of the Gun Control Act of 1968 (codified at 18 U.S. Code § 922(g)) criminalizes firearms purchases by, and firearms sales to, people who have renounced United States citizenship. This provision, along with similar treatment for people adjudged mentally defective or dishonorably discharged from the U.S. Armed Forces, and a restriction on mail-order firearms sales, was aimed at preventing a repeat of the circumstances which allowed Lee Harvey Oswald to obtain the rifle which he used to assassinate President Kennedy. Oswald had never actually renounced his citizenship; he went to the U.S. embassy in Moscow one Saturday in 1959 intending to do so, but in order to delay him, Richard Edward Snyder requested that he come back on a weekday to complete the paperwork and swear the formal oath of renunciation, which Oswald never did.

The Bureau of Alcohol, Tobacco and Firearms (ATF) interprets the word "renounced" in this provision of law to apply only to persons who swore an oath of renunciation U.S. citizenship before a designated U.S. government official, and not those who committed other relinquishing acts. ATF further stated that a court appeal which reverses a renunciation also removes firearms disabilities, but that a renunciant who subsequently obtains United States citizenship again through naturalization would continue to be barred from purchasing firearms. Under the Brady Handgun Violence Prevention Act of 1993, individuals who are barred from purchasing firearms due to this provision or other provisions of the same law have their names entered into the National Instant Criminal Background Check System.

The Safe Explosives Act (a portion of the Homeland Security Act of 2002) expanded the list of people who may not lawfully transport, ship, receive or possess explosive materials to include people who have renounced their U.S. citizenship. In 2003, ATF promulgated regulations under that act providing for a definition of renunciation of citizenship consistent with that under the regulations to the Gun Control Act of 1968 and the Brady Act of 1993.

=== Social Security benefits ===
In general, ex-U.S. citizens are treated like any other aliens for purposes of Social Security retirement benefits. (Note: Under the No Social Security for Nazis Act of 2014, a person who admitted participation in Nazi persecution and renounced U.S. citizenship pursuant to a settlement agreement with the Attorney General to avoid prosecution for that participation becomes ineligible for Social Security benefits. See "RS 02635.040 No Social Security for Nazis Act of 2014". Program Operations Manual System. January 13, 2015.) Those who have earned qualifying wages for at least forty quarters are eligible to receive benefits, while those who have not are ineligible. "Qualifying wages" excludes wages paid abroad by a non-U.S. employer, so in general people who have resided abroad for their entire working lives did not pay into Social Security and are not eligible for benefits, regardless of their citizenship.

Additionally, aliens face restrictions on eligibility for payments based on their country of citizenship or residence, whereas U.S. citizens do not. Residents of countries which have a totalization agreement with the United States, as well as citizens of 53 other countries, can receive Social Security payments indefinitely while residing outside of the United States. Otherwise, Social Security benefit payments will stop after the alien has spent six full calendar months outside of the United States, and cannot be resumed until the alien spends one full calendar month inside of the United States and is lawfully present for that entire month. U.S. citizens, in contrast, can receive Social Security payments outside of the U.S. regardless of their length of residence abroad.

=== Other government benefits ===
Relinquishment of U.S. citizenship does not result in loss of Medicare benefits if one was eligible prior to relinquishing. Medicare does not cover medical treatment outside of the U.S. for either citizens or non-citizens, meaning that Medicare beneficiaries would have to travel to the U.S. in order to use their benefits. Furthermore, Medicare beneficiaries who wish to retain their Part B benefits must continue to pay Part B premiums even while living outside of the United States.

Retired members of the United States Armed Forces who cease to be U.S. citizens may lose their entitlement to veterans' benefits, if the right to benefits is dependent on the retiree's continued military status.

Under Department of Energy guidelines, an action that shows allegiance to a country other than the United States, such as a declaration of intent to renounce U.S. citizenship or actual renunciation of citizenship, demonstrates foreign preference and thus is a ground to deny a security clearance.

== Notable people ==
Below is a gallery of some individuals who relinquished United States citizenship, listed by their other citizenship (dependent territories listed with the country in parentheses afterwards).

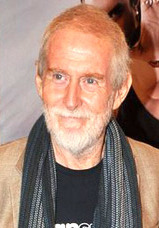
Tom Alter
India

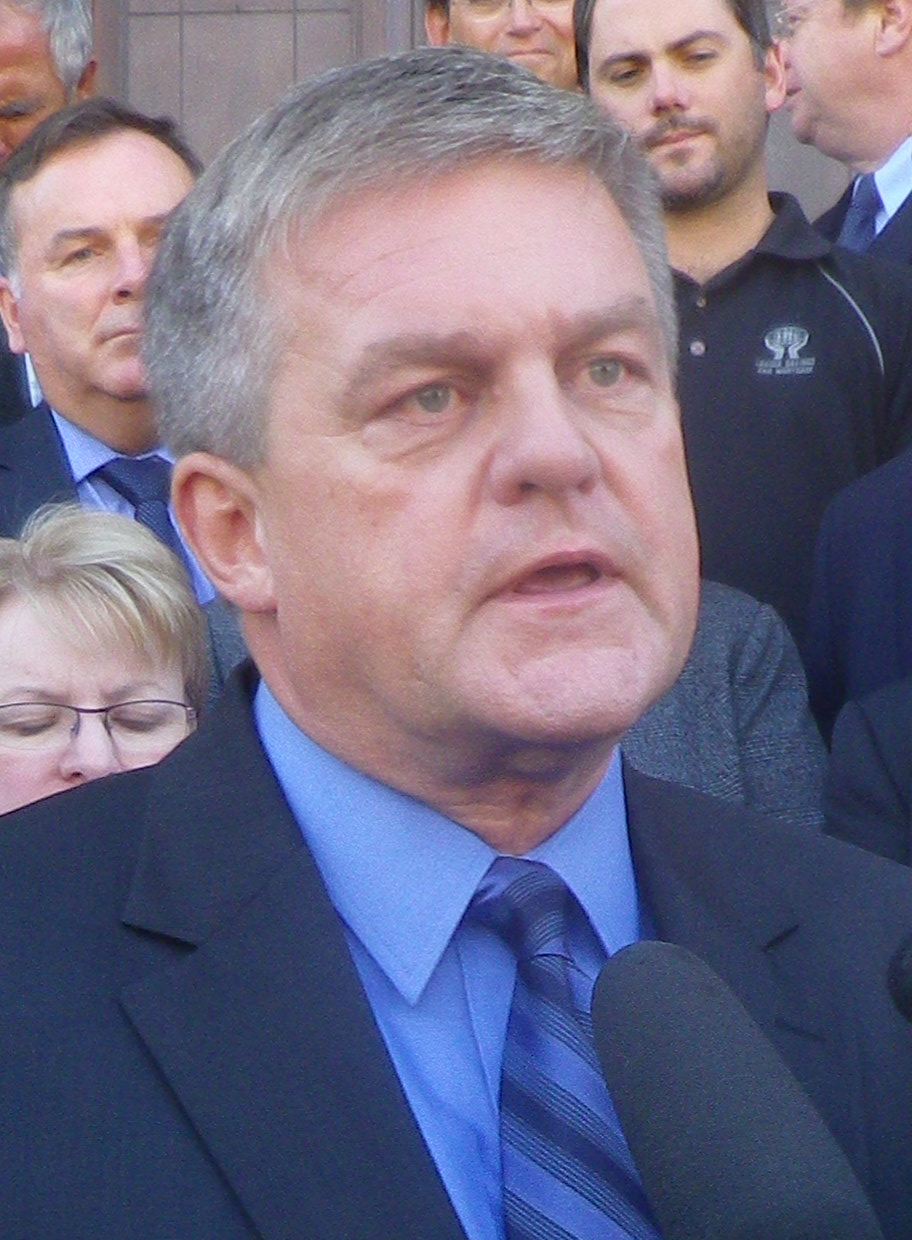
David Alward
Canada

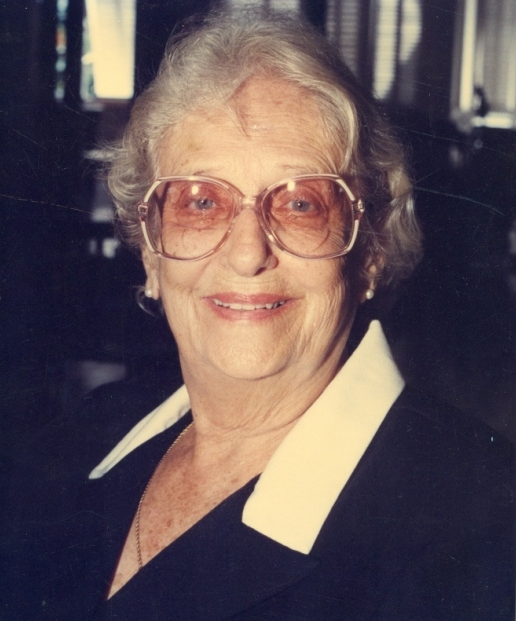
Janet Jagan
Guyana

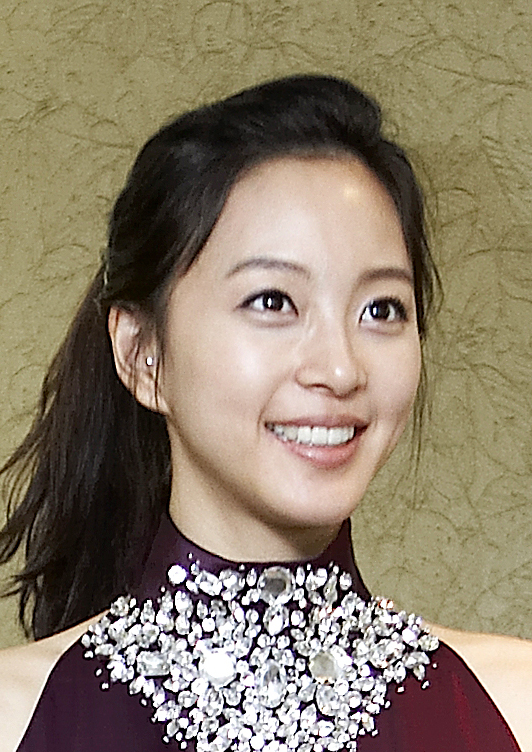
Han Ye-seul
South Korea

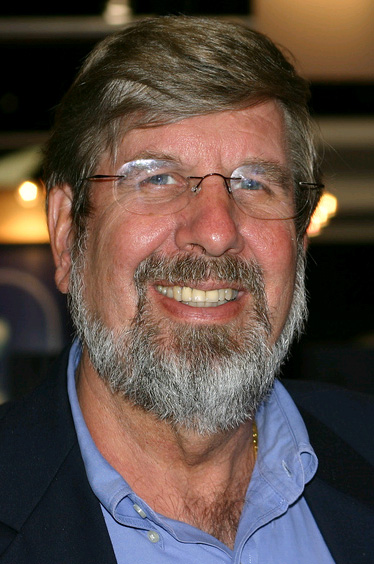
William Heinecke
Thailand

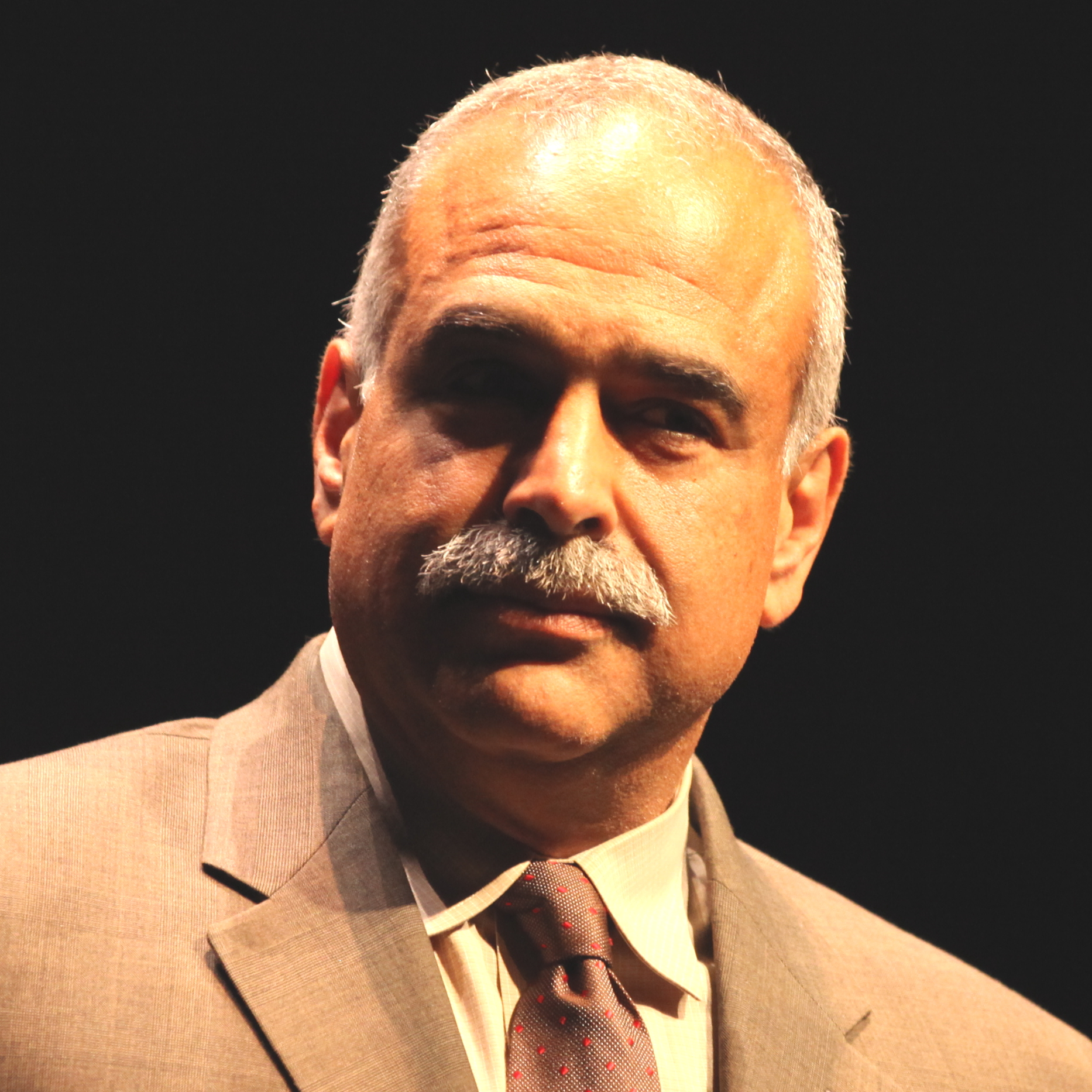
Raffi Hovannisian
Armenia

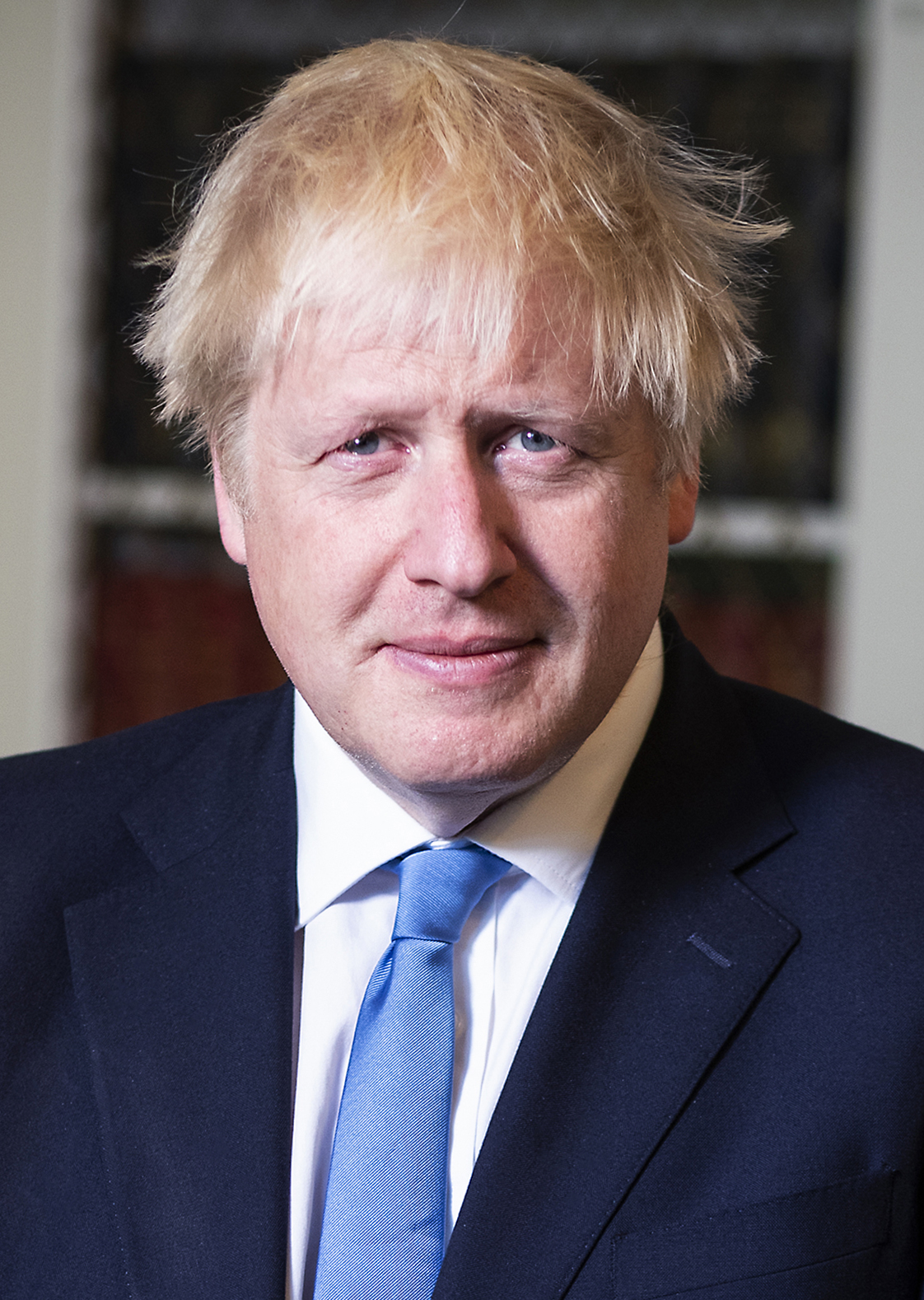
Boris Johnson
United Kingdom

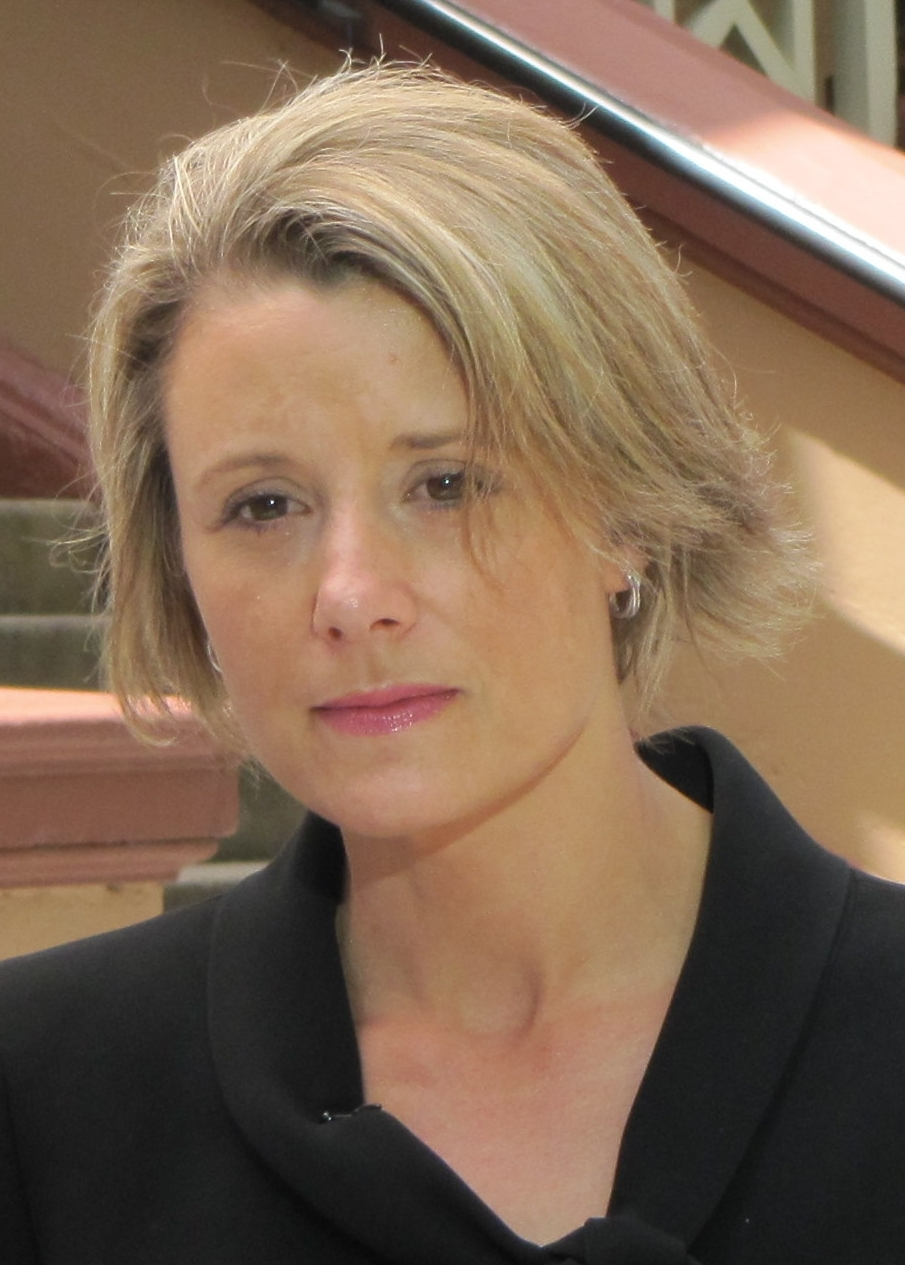
Kristina Keneally
Australia

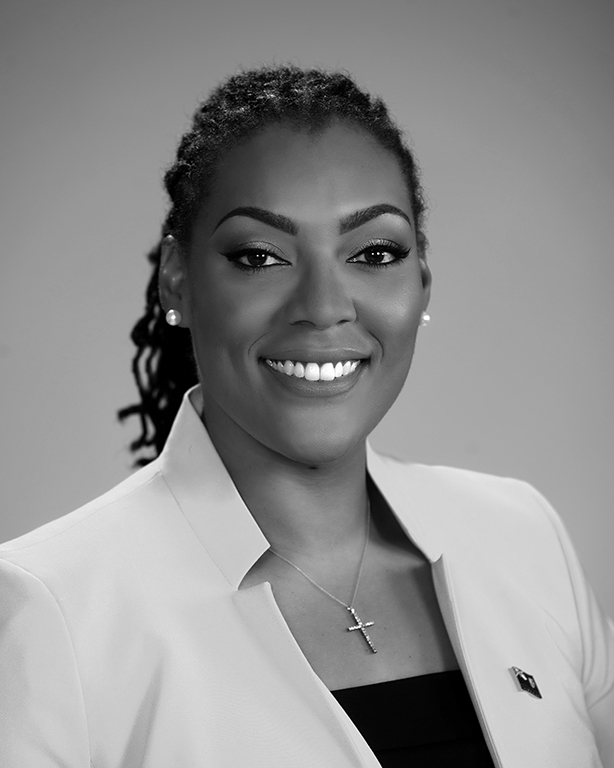
Akierra Missick
Turks and Caicos
(United Kingdom)

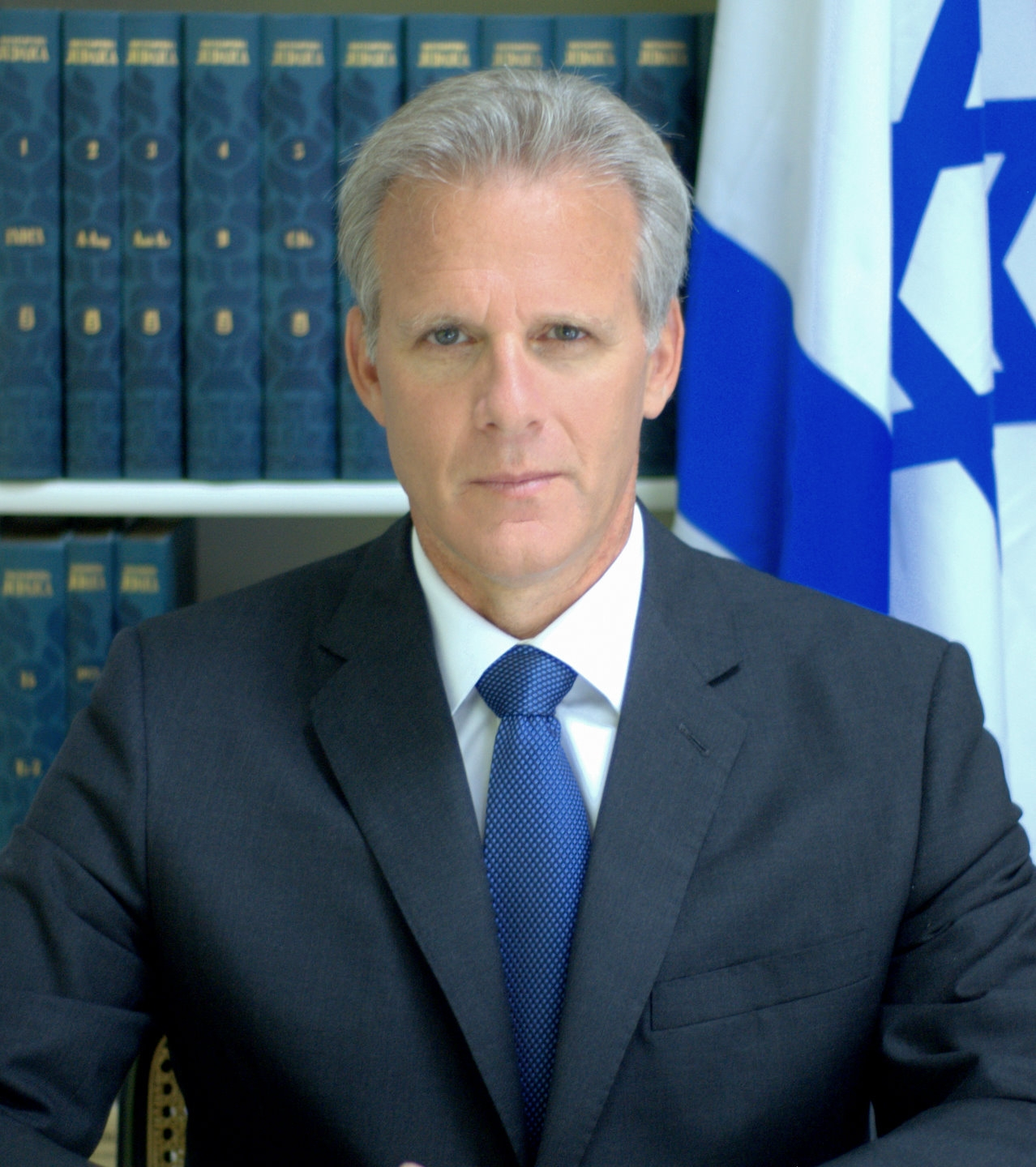
Michael Oren
Israel

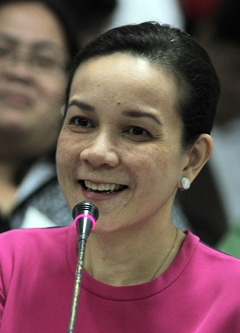
Grace Poe
Philippines

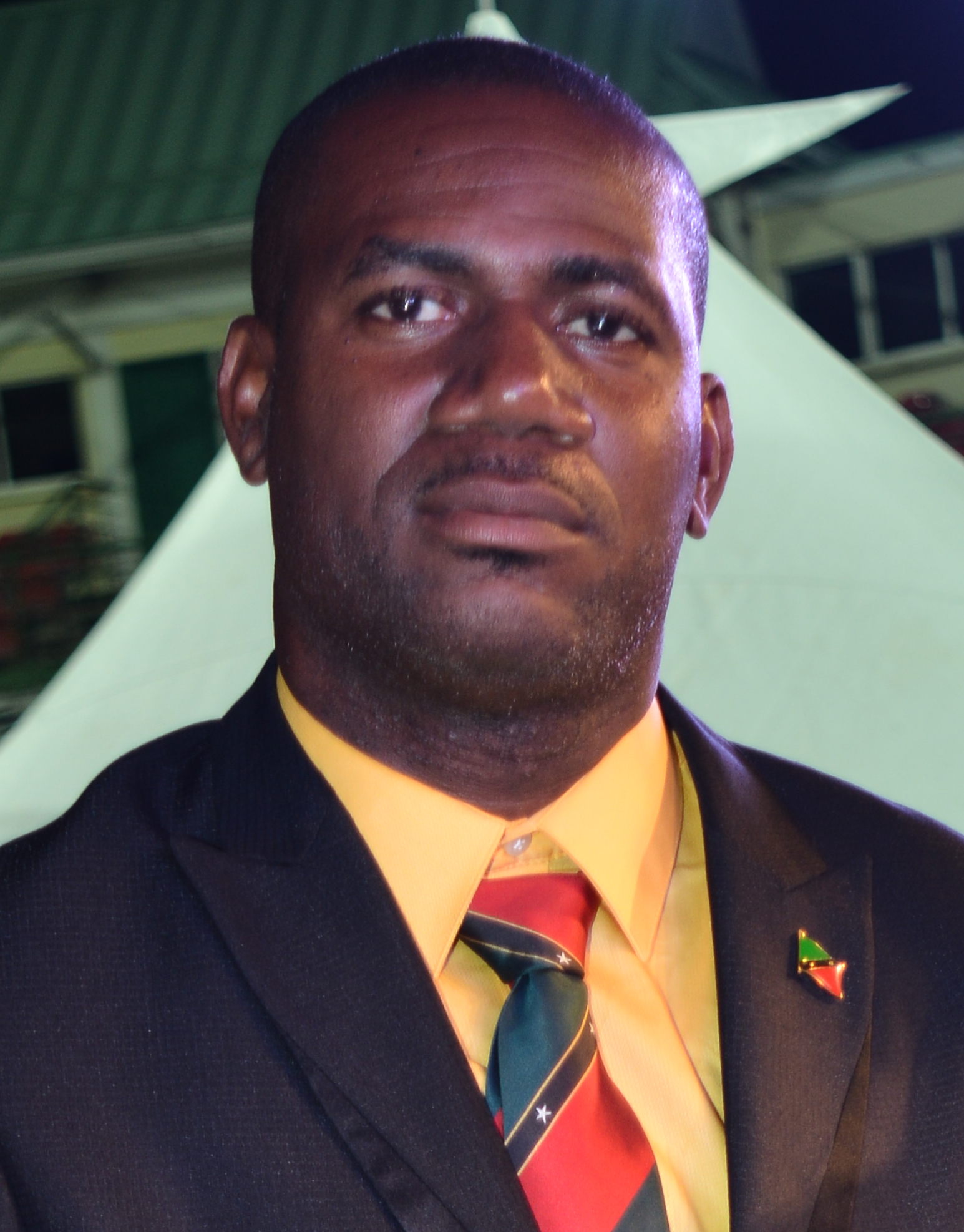
Shawn Richards
Saint Kitts and Nevis

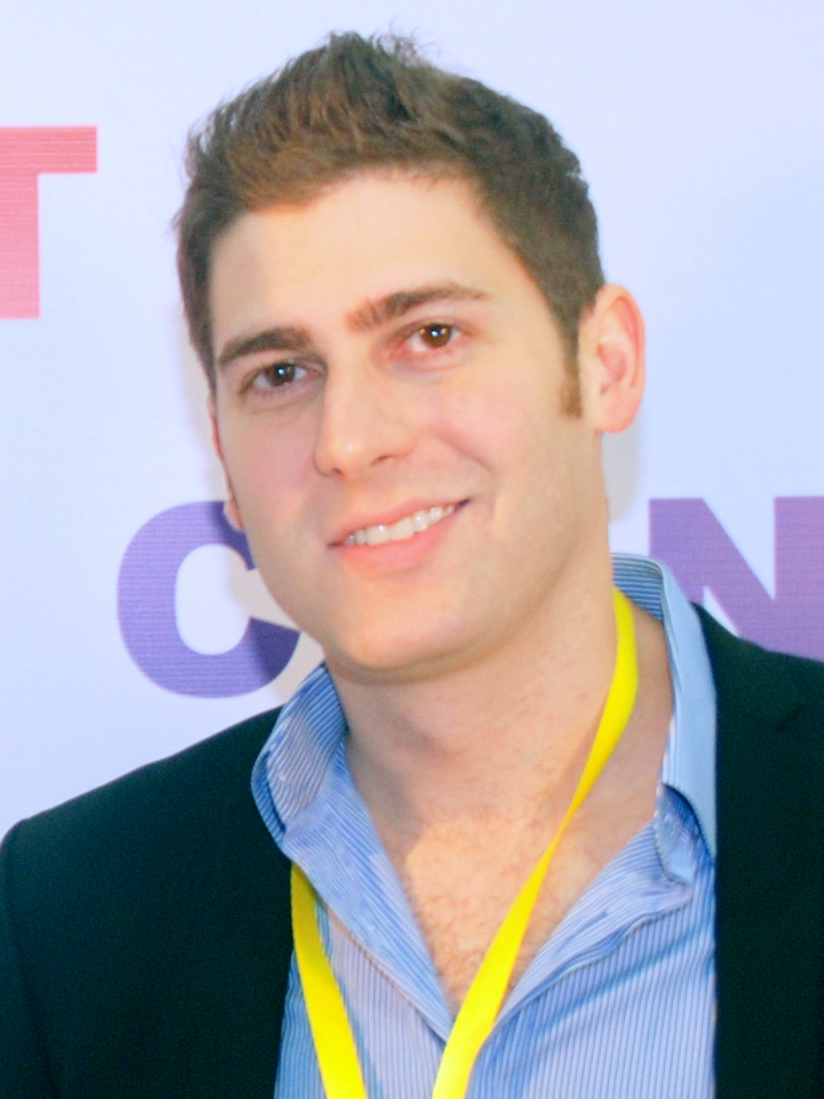
Eduardo Saverin
Brazil

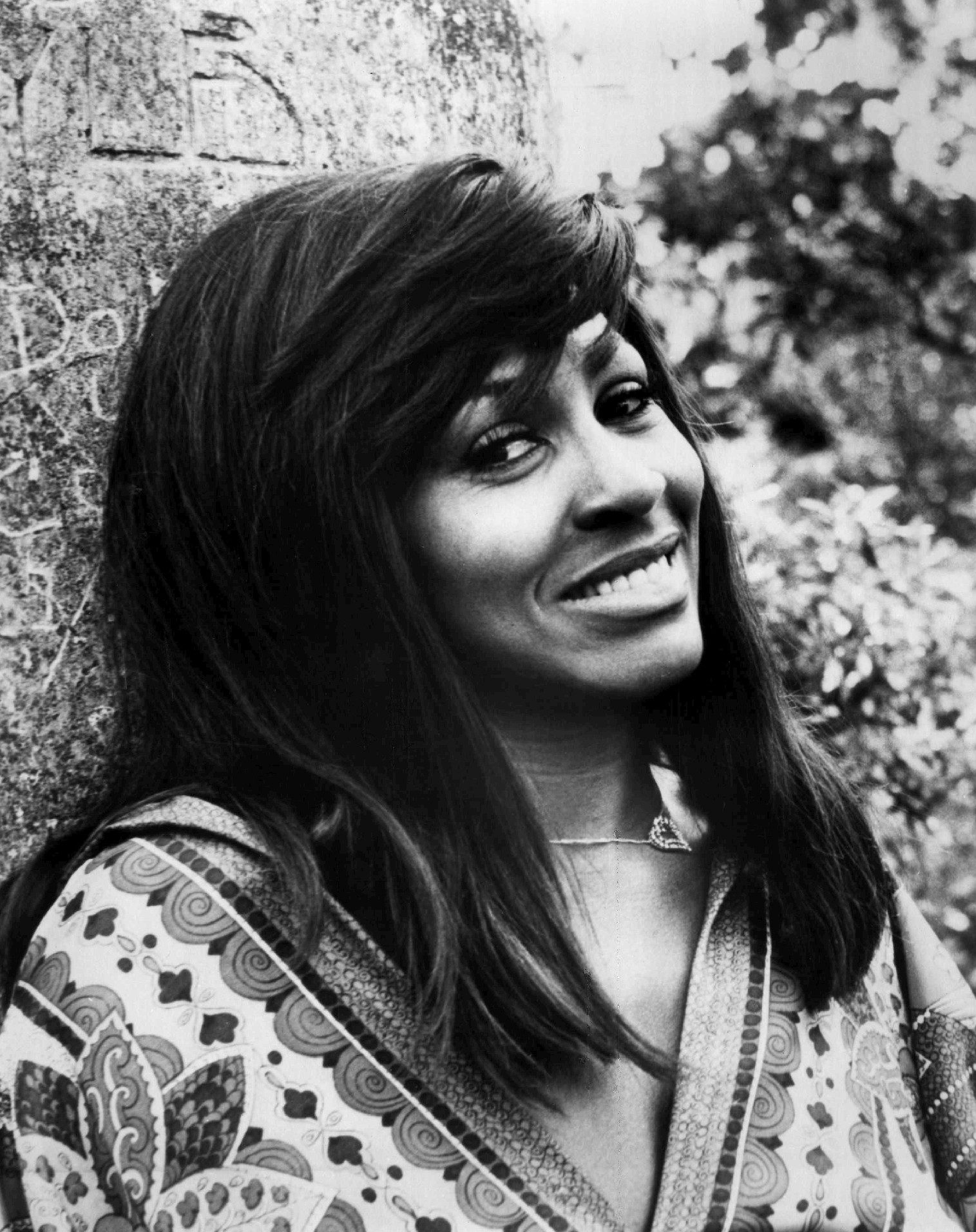
Tina Turner
Switzerland

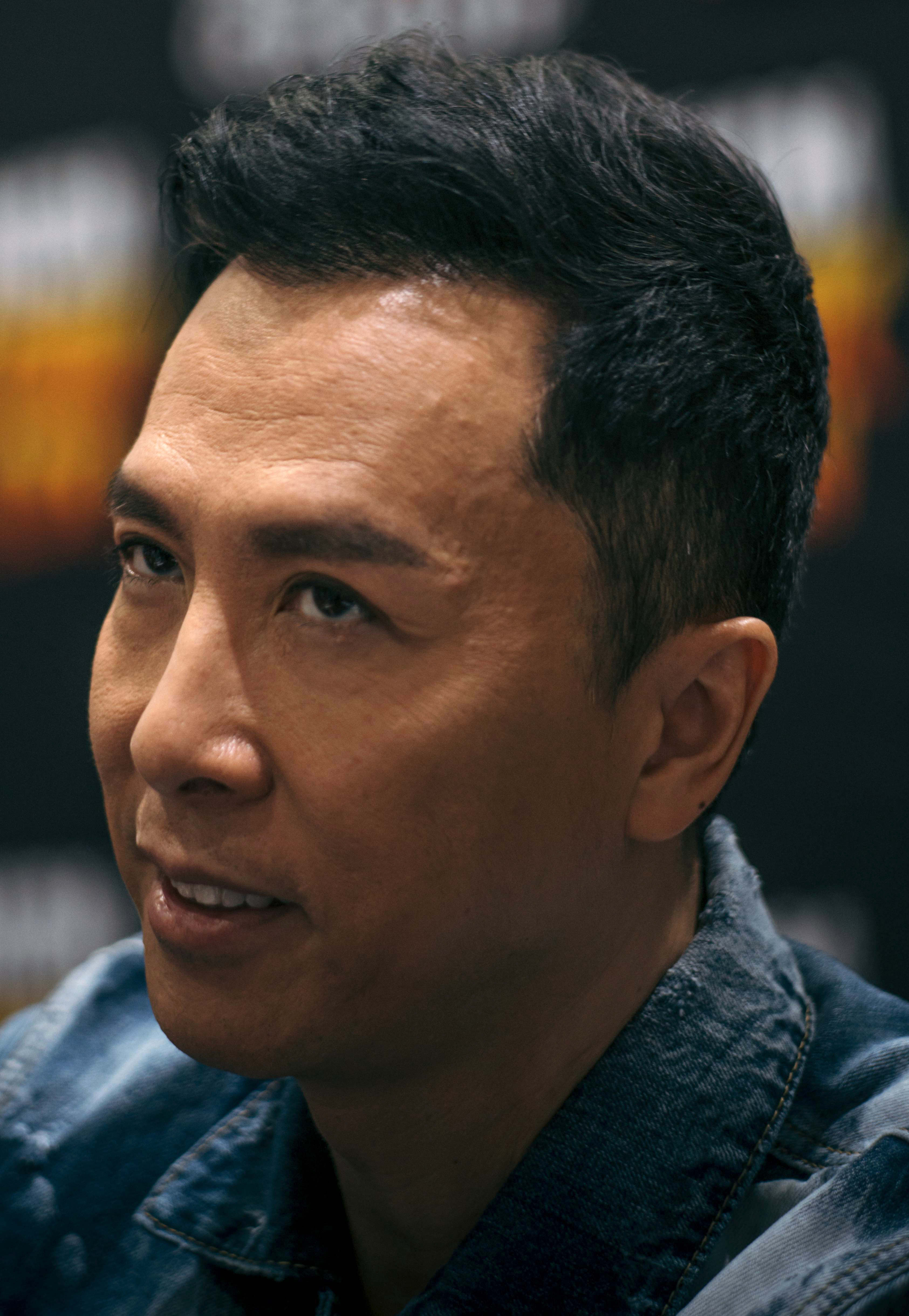
Donnie Yen
Hong Kong SAR
(China)

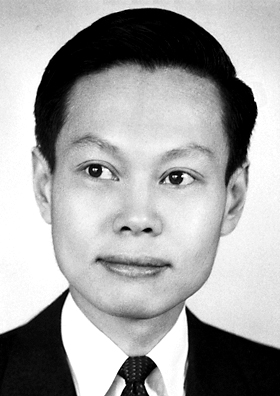
Yang Chen-Ning
China

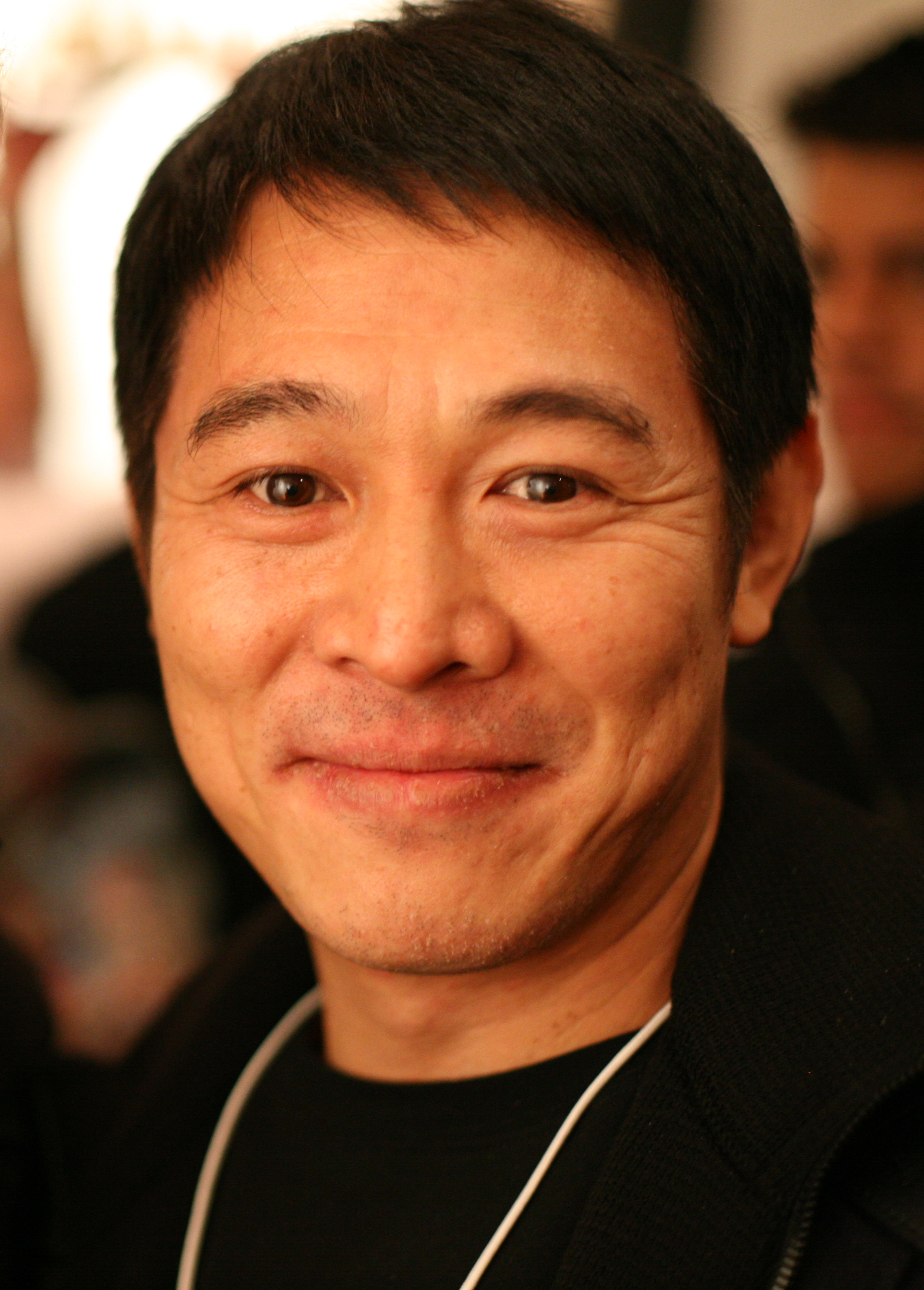
Jet Li
Singapore

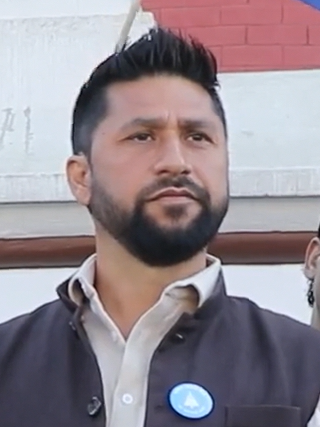
Rabi Lamichhane Nepal
