= Friction: An Ethnography of Global Connection =

Scholarly article published in Current Anthropology

Friction: An Ethnography of Global Connection is a 2004 non-fiction book by American anthropologist Anna Tsing. Published by Princeton University Press. The book investigates the complex local and global forces interacting in the exploitation and conservation of the Indonesian rainforests during the 1980s and 1990s.

== Review ==
Reviewers mentioned that the book offers a nuanced alternative to the frictionless models of globalization popularized. Thomas Yarrow noted that the book is fragmented, episodic structure occasionally sacrificed deeper ethnographic intimacy with local subjects. A review published in Ethnography noted that the book's conceptualization of globalization as a messy, grounded process that does not attach inherent morality to a monolithic global era offered a new paradigm for studying transnational networks. A review by Andrew Willford noted that the book's methodological framework of studying a single zone of awkward engagement heavily influenced subsequent anthropological studies.

Awards

The book was a joint winner of the Senior Book Prize awarded by the American Ethnological Society.
