= Gary Gereffi =

American academic and author

Professor Emeritus Gary Gereffi
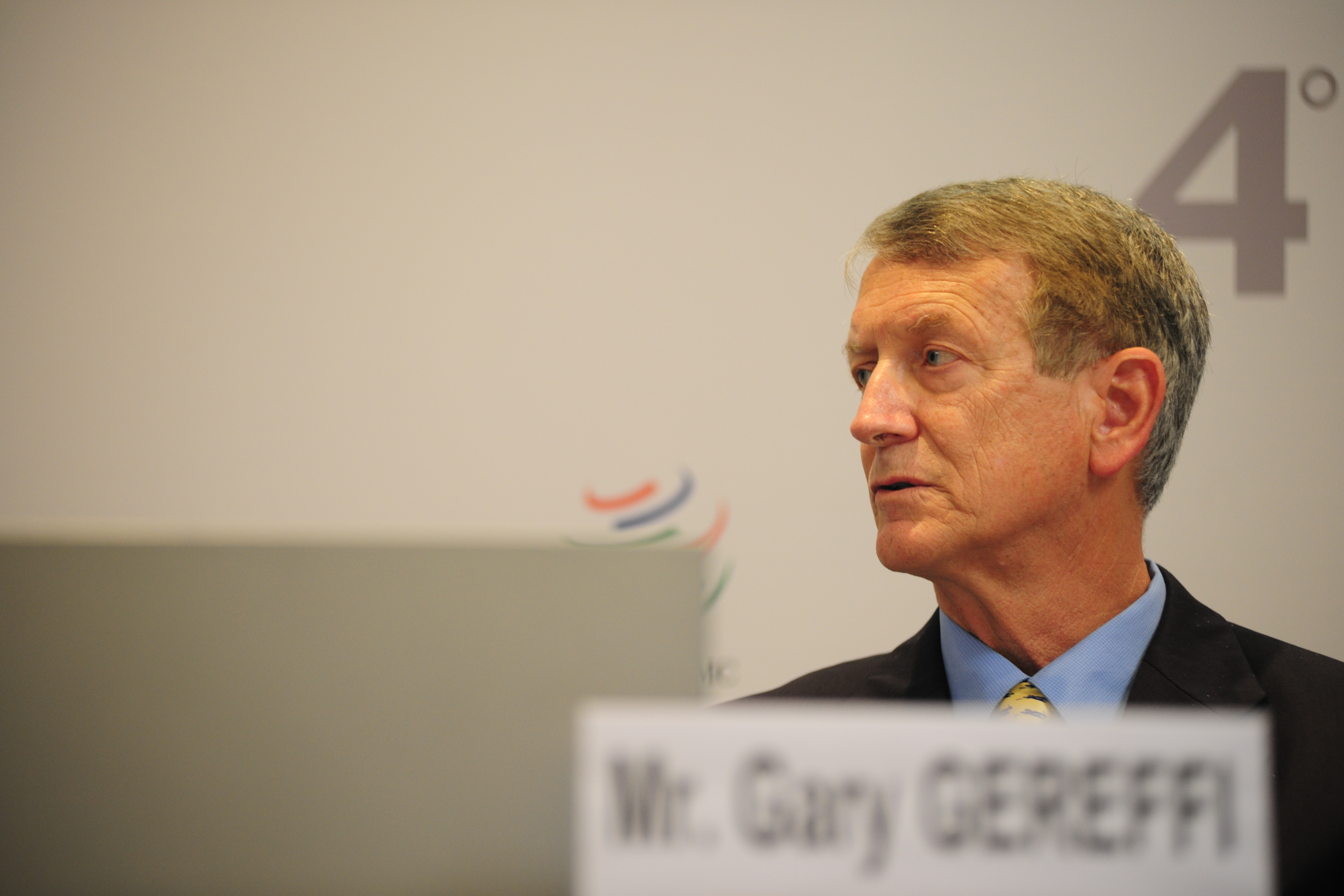
- Gereffi at the WTO Fourth Global Review of Aid for Trade (2013)
- Born: Gary Allan Gereffi; July 23, 1948 (age 78); Pittsburgh, Pennsylvania
- Spouse: Pela Gereffi
- Children: 2, Emily Gereffi and Karen Gereffi Goodman

Academic background
- Education: B.A. (University of Notre Dame), M.Phil., Ph.D. (Yale University)
- Alma mater: Yale University
- Thesis: "Wonder Drugs" and Transnational Corporations in Mexico: An Elaboration and a Limiting-case Test of Dependency Theory (1980)
- Doctoral advisor: Alfred Stepan, Louis Wolf Goodman

Academic work
- Discipline: Sociology
- Sub-discipline: Economic sociology, economic geography, regional economics, international development
- Institutions: Duke University
- Main interests: Economic sociology, international business and development, industrial policy, global supply chain management, sustainable development
- Notable works: The Pharmaceutical Industry and Dependency in the Third World (1983); Manufacturing Miracles: Paths of Industrialization in Latin America and East Asia (1990); Commodity Chains and Global Capitalism (1994); Free Trade and Uneven Development: The North American Apparel Industry after NAFTA (2002); The New Offshoring of Jobs and Global Development (2006); Global Value Chains and Development: Redefining the Contours of 21st Century Capitalism (2018); Local Clusters in Global Value Chains: Linking Actors and Territories Through Manufacturing and Innovation (2018); Handbook on Global Value Chains (2019); China’s New Development Strategies: Upgrading from Above and from Below in Global Value Chains (2022)
- Notable ideas: Global value chains; industry governance structures; upgrading trajectories; national and regional development strategies; empirical studies of global industries

Gary Allan Gereffi (born July 23, 1948 in Pittsburgh, Pennsylvania) is an American economic sociologist, policy activist, author, and academic. Gereffi is emeritus Professor of Sociology and Founding Director of the Global Value Chains Center (Note: Original name was "Center on Globalization, Governance & Competitiveness" (CGGC); name changed to Duke GVC Center in 2017.) at Duke University. He is one of the originators of the Global Value Chains (GVC) framework and he is known for his work on governance structures and upgrading strategies in GVCs, global commodity chain (GCCs), dependency theory, cross-regional development strategies in Latin America and East Asia, and the role of multinational corporations (MNCs) in development.

Gereffi has written on global value chains and their relationship to international development, and has collaborated with multilateral organizations. (Note: E.g., International Labor Organization, World Trade Organization, United Nations Conference on Trade and Development, World Bank, U.S. Agency for International Development, U.K. Department for International Development, Inter-American Development Bank, World Economic Forum) His work with scholars like Raphael Kaplinsky, John Humphrey, Timothy Sturgeon, Stefano Ponte, Jennifer Bair, Joonkoo Lee and Valentina De Marchi produced a theoretical framework that addresses the complexities of globalization.

== Early life and education ==
Gereffi was born in 1948 in Pittsburgh, Pennsylvania to Emily and Nicky Gereffi (homemaker and watchmaker/letter carrier, respectively). Gary was the oldest of four children (two brothers, Paul and Mark, and a sister, Holly). The family moved to Fort Lauderdale, Florida in 1955 and Gary graduated from Cardinal Gibbons High School in 1966.

He attended the University of Notre Dame on a National Association of Letter Carriers scholarship and graduated in 1970 with a B.A. degree in sociology. Gerefii began his doctoral studies in sociology at Yale in 1971. He received his PhD from Yale and pursued an interdisciplinary program in international development. Mentored by scholars like Louis Wolf Goodman and Alfred Stepan, who worked on MNCs in Latin America and were familiar with dependency theory, Gereffi received funding for a two-year Foreign Area Fellowship from the Social Science Research Council (SSRC) to study MNCs in Mexico. There, he worked on his dissertation project which focused on MNCs in the pharmaceutical industry in Mexico. Gereffi subsequently worked at Harvard University, the United Nations Centre on Transnational Corporations in New York, and the Pan American Health Organization in Washington, DC, conducting policy-related studies of multinational corporations in the pharmaceutical industry.

== Career ==
In 1980, Gereffi joined the faculty in the Sociology Department at Duke University. Five years later, in 1985, he became an associate professor with tenure. In 1994, he became a full Professor of Sociology at Duke and stayed there until 2018. He served as the Director of Markets and Management Studies Program at Duke from 1997 to 2003, and as the Founding Director of the Center on Globalization, Governance & Competitiveness (CGGC) from 2006 to 2018. Gereffi has been an Emeritus Professor of Sociology at Duke since 2018.

=== Global value chains research ===
Gereffi's research has focused on global value chains (GVCs), building on earlier work in dependency theory and world-systems theory. His 1994 co-edited volume with Miguel Korzeniewicz, Commodity Chains and Global Capitalism, introduced the global commodity chains framework.

In 2005, Gereffi, John Humphrey, and Timothy Sturgeon published an influential article in the Review of International Political Economy that proposed a typology of five governance structures in global value chains: market, modular, relational, captive, and hierarchy. This framework has been widely cited in international business and development studies.

His 2018 book Global Value Chains and Development: Redefining the Contours of 21st Century Capitalism examines how global supply chains have evolved and their implications for economic development.

=== COVID-19 pandemic and supply chains ===
During the COVID-19 pandemic, Gereffi wrote about vulnerabilities in global value chains for medical supplies. In a 2021 article for UNIDO's Industrial Analytics Platform, Gereffi examined the supply chains for COVID-critical medical supplies and argued for balancing flexibility with the efficiency benefits of GVCs. He suggested that building resilience requires careful consideration of redundancy, risk management, and standardization, avoiding a complete loss of cost control. He also warned against a hasty shift from a 'just-in-time' to a 'just-in-case' economy, as it may undermine the gains associated with integrated GVCs.

=== Testimony in the U.S. Senate (2021) ===
On July 15, 2021, Gereffi presented an oral and written testimony toHis testimony addressed supply chain resiliency.His testimony focused on the crucial issue of "Implementing Supply Chain Resiliency." He discussed the development of supply chain research and offered recommendations for federal government action.

=== University of Padova Honorary Doctorate in Economics and Management ===
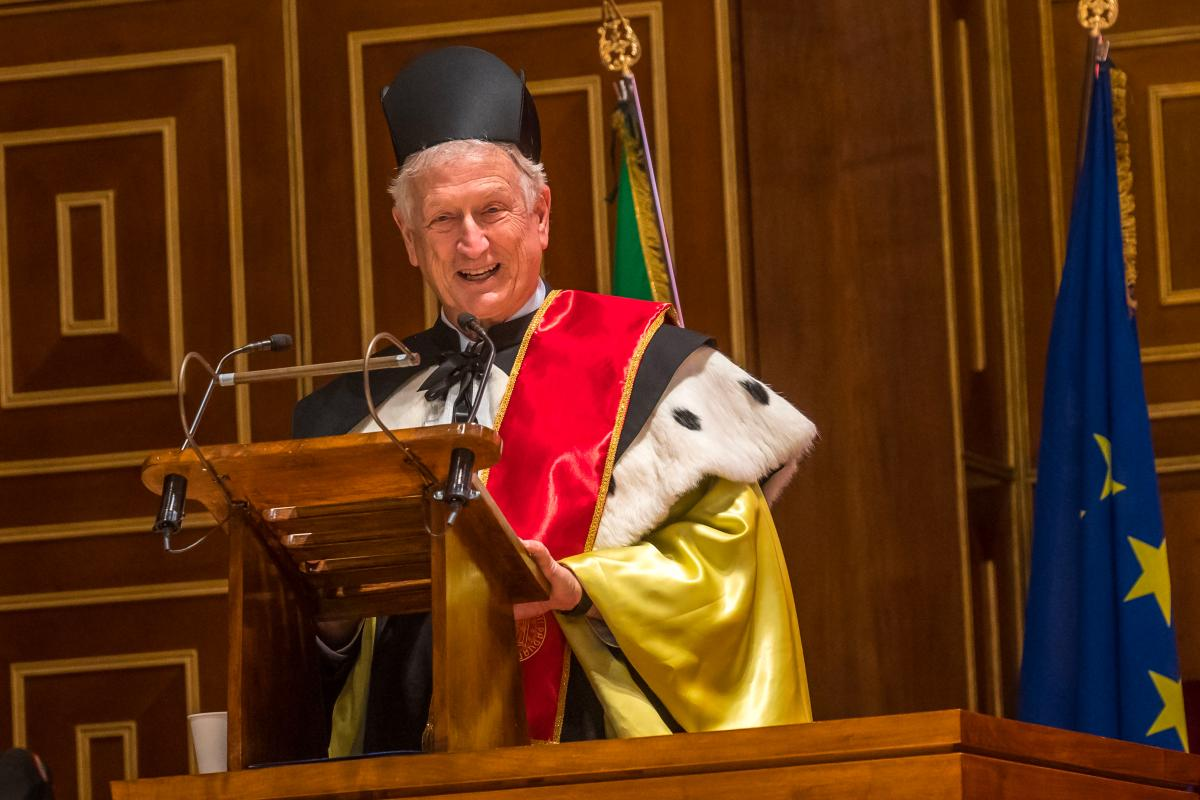
Gereffi delivering a lecture "Reglobalization in a Post-Pandemic Supply Chain World" amid the reception of an Honorary Doctorate in Economics and Management from the University of Padova (March 13, 2023)

On March 13, 2023, the University of Padova awarded Gereffi an Honorary Doctorate in Economics and Management as part of its 800th anniversary celebrations. A live-streamed ceremony for the event was organized with leading GVC scholars attending. Later, the University of Padova assembled the proceedings and speeches of the ceremony and published it in both Italian and English (under a Creative Commons license). Edited by Valentina De Marchi, Marco Bettiol, and Eleonora Di Maria, the English version is titled “Global Value Chain studies: taking stock, looking ahead”. Gereffi's extensive collaboration with Italian scholars began in spring 2005 when Gereffi went to Venice International University on the island of San Servolo in Venice for a semester of teaching. Since that date, multiple scholars from the Venetian and Paduan “schools” in Italy have made significant contributions to GVC scholarship, often in collaboration with Gereffi. A few of the more distinctive themes include: (a) extending the well-known research on Italian “industrial districts” to include new theoretical and empirical insights based on GVC theory concerning the governance and upgrading of global supply chains; (b) a more detailed analysis of the role of small and medium-sized enterprises (SMEs) in the evolution and internationalization of Italian industrial districts; and (c) adding environmental upgrading and sustainability to the topics being addressed by Italian scholars in the GVC literature.

=== EIBA 2024 Distinguished Honorary Fellow Award ===
Gereffi received the European International Business Academy's (EIBA) Distinguished Honorary Fellow Award in December 2024 at the organization's 50th Annual Conference in Espoo, Finland. Gereffi received the award at the Gala Dinner on December 14, 2024. EIBA recognized his contributions on global value chains, noting how his work informed both academic research and policy discussions on economic development, trade, and sustainability. He joined a prestigious list of previous awardees that included former Nokia CEO Jorma Ollila, Financial Times columnist Martin Wolf, and UCLA Professor Michael Storper.

=== Nearshoring in Mexico: a 2025 ECLAC study ===
In 2025, the United Nations' Economic Commission for Latin America and the Caribbean (ECLAC) commissioned Gereffi to produce a report titled, "Nearshoring in Mexico: Diverse Options for Industrial Upgrading". The report analyzed the complexities and policy considerations associated with shifting segments of supply chains closer to the United States. The study focused on Mexico's experiences under previous industrial regimes, the implications of global value chains, and the country's position amid mounting U.S.–China tensions. The report argued that nearshoring strategies in Mexico require active industrial policy to strengthen infrastructure and technological capabilities.

== Bibliography ==
=== Selected books ===
- Gereffi, Gary. Global value chains and development: Redefining the contours of 21st century capitalism. Cambridge University Press, 2018. ISBN 978-1108458863
- Gereffi, Gary. The pharmaceutical industry and dependency in the third world. Princeton University Press, 1983. Vol. 4964.

=== Selected edited books ===
- De Marchi, Valentina, Bettiol, Marco, and Di Maria, Eleonora, eds. Global Value Chain Studies: Taking Stock, Looking Ahead: Proceedings of the Doctorate ad Honorem Awarding Ceremony to Prof. Gary Gereffi and related workshop. Padova University Press, 2023.
- Gereffi, Gary, Bamber, Penny, and Fernandez-Stark, Karina, eds. China's new development strategies: Upgrading from Above and from Below in Global Value Chains. Palgrave Macmillan, 2022.
- Ponte, Stefano, Gereffi, Gary, and Raj-Reichert, Gale, eds. Handbook on global value chains. Edward Elgar Publishing, 2019.
- De Marchi, Valentina, Di Maria, Eleonora, and Gereffi, Garry, eds. Local clusters in global value chains: Linking actors and territories through manufacturing and innovation. Routledge, 2018.
- Cattaneo, Olivier, Gereffi, Gary, and Staritz, Cornelia, eds. Global value chains in a postcrisis world: a development perspective. World Bank Publications, 2010.
- Gereffi, Gary and Wyman, Donald L., eds. Manufacturing miracles: Paths of industrialization in Latin America and East Asia. Princeton University Press, 1990.

=== Selected book chapters ===
- De Marchi, Valentina, Di Maria, Eleonora, Krishnan, Aarti, and Ponte, Stefano. "Environmental upgrading in global value chains," In Stefano Ponte, Gary Gereffi and Gale Raj-Reichert (eds.), Handbook on Global Value Chains, Chapter 19 (Cheltenham, UK: Edward Elgar Publishing, 2019), pp. 310–323.
- Gereffi, Gary. "Economic Upgrading in Global Value Chains," In Stefano Ponte, Gary Gereffi and Gale Raj-Reichert (eds.), Handbook on Global Value Chains, Chapter 14 (Cheltenham, UK: Edward Elgar Publishing, 2019), pp. 240–254.
- Mayer, Frederick, and Gereffi, Gary. "International development organizations and global value chains." In Stefano Ponte, Gary Gereffi and Gale Raj-Reichert (eds.), Handbook on Global Value Chains, Chapter 35 (Cheltenham, UK: Edward Elgar Publishing, 2019). pp. 570–584.
- Gereffi, Gary and Wu, Xinyi. "Global Value Chains, Industrial Hubs, and Economic Development in the 21st Century." In Arkebe Oqubay and Justin Lifu Lin (eds.), The Oxford Handbook of Industrial Hubs and Economic Development, (Oxford, UK: Oxford University Press, 2020). pp. 1049–1068 doi:10.1093/oxfordhb/9780198850434.013.53
- Gary Gereffi, On the Road to Global Value Chains: How Industry Dynamics Reshaped Development Theory. In Matthias Kipping, Takafumi Kurosawa, and D. Eleanor Westney (eds.), The Oxford Handbook of Industry Dynamics (Oxford, UK: Oxford University Press, 2025), pp. 5–6. doi:10.1093/oxfordhb/9780190933463.013.40

=== Selected articles ===
- Gereffi, Gary. Navigating 21st century industrial policy. Columbia FDI Perspectives (366), 2023.
- Gereffi, Gary. How to make global supply chains more resilient. Columbia FDI Perspectives (348), 2023.
- De Marchi, Valentina, and Gary Gereffi. "Using the global value chain framework to analyse and tackle global environmental crises." Journal of Industrial and Business Economics 50(1), 2023: 149–159. doi:10.1007/s40812-022-00253-x
- Lee, Cassey. "Handbook on Global Value Chains" In Stefano Ponte, Gary Gereffi and Gale Raj-Reichert (eds.), Journal of Southeast Asian Economies (JSEAE) 39(3), 2022: 342–343.
- Canello, Jacopo, Giulio Buciuni, and Gary Gereffi. "Reshoring by small firms: dual sourcing strategies and local subcontracting in value chains." Cambridge Journal of Regions, Economy and Society 15(2), 2022: 237–259. doi:10.1093/cjres/rsac015
- Gereffi, Gary, Pavida Pananond, and Torben Pedersen. "Resilience decoded: the role of firms, global value chains, and the state in COVID-19 medical supplies." California Management Review 64(2), 2022: 46–70. doi:10.1177/00081256211069420
- Gereffi, Gary, Hyun-Chin Lim, and Joonkoo Lee. "Trade policies, firm strategies, and adaptive reconfigurations of global value chains." Journal of International Business Policy (4), 2021: 506-522 doi:10.1057/s42214-021-00102-z
- Lee, Joonkoo, and Gary Gereffi. "Innovation, upgrading, and governance in cross-sectoral global value chains: the case of smartphones." Industrial and Corporate Change 30(1), 2021: 215–231. doi:10.1093/icc/dtaa062
- Gereffi, Gary. "What does the COVID-19 pandemic teach us about global value chains? The case of medical supplies." Journal of International Business Policy (3), 2020: 287–301. doi:10.1057/s42214-020-00062-w
- Pananond, Pavida, Gary Gereffi, and Torben Pedersen. "An integrative typology of global strategy and global value chains: the management and organization of cross‐border activities." Global Strategy Journal 10(3), 2020: 421–443. doi:10.1002/gsj.1388
- Gereffi, Gary. "Global value chains and international development policy: Bringing firms, networks and policy-engaged scholarship back in." Journal of International Business Policy (2), 2019: 195–210. doi:10.1057/s42214-019-00028-7
- Li, Fuyi, Stacey Frederick, and Gary Gereffi. "E-commerce and industrial upgrading in the Chinese apparel value chain." Journal of Contemporary Asia 49(1), 2019: 24–53. doi:10.1080/00472336.2018.1481220
- Gereffi, Gary, Stacey Frederick, and Penny Bamber. "Diverse paths of upgrading in high-tech manufacturing: Costa Rica in the electronics and medical devices global value chains." Transnational Corporations 26, (1), 2019: 1-29.
- De Marchi, Valentina, Joonkoo Lee, and Gary Gereffi. "Globalization, Recession and the Internationalization of Industrial Districts: Experiences from the Italian Gold Jewellery Industry." European Planning Studies 22(4), 2014: 866–884. doi:10.1080/09654313.2013.771624

== Honors and awards ==
On March 13, 2023, the University of Padua awarded Gereffi an honorary doctorate in Economics and Management. The event included a lecture by Gereffi on "Reglobalization in a Post-Pandemic Supply Chain World".
