= Stephen Ball (sociologist) =

British sociologist

Stephen J. Ball
- Born: 21 January 1950 (age 76)
- Education: University of Essex (BA, 1972); University of Sussex (MA, 1973; DPhil, 1978)
- Known for: Policy sociology
- Awards: Fellow of the Royal Society of Arts since 1998; Fellow of the British Academy since 2006
- Scientific career
- Fields: Sociology of education Education policy
- Workplaces: University of Sussex (1975-1985); King's College London (1985-2001); University of London (2001-2014); University College London (2014–present)
- Website: www.ucl.ac.uk/ioe/about/ioe-life/academics/stephen-ball

Stephen John Ball, FRSA, FBA, FAcSS (born 21 January 1950) is a British sociologist and former Karl Mannheim Professor of Sociology of Education at the Institute of Education of University College London (formerly part of the University of London). He has been described as "one of the most eminent scholars in the field of education policy".

== Early life and education ==
Ball was born 21 January 1950 to John and Berry Ball. He attended the University of Essex, where he received a BA in sociology in 1972, and the University of Sussex, where he gained an MA in social studies in 1975 and a DPhil in sociology in 1978.

== Career ==
Ball began his career as a lecturer in education at the University of Sussex after receiving his MA in 1975. He stayed there until 1985, at which point he moved to King's College London as a lecturer in urban education, becoming a reader in the sociology of education in 1990 and then professor of education in 1991. In 2001 he moved to the Institute of Education, where he has remained since.

== Recognition ==
In 2013, Michael W. Apple wrote that "...one of the things that set Stephen Ball apart from many others is his insistence that both structural and poststructural theories and analyses are necessary for ‘bearing witness’ and for an adequate critical understanding of educational realities". He is the co-editor-in-chief of the Journal of Education Policy, alongside founding editor Ivor Goodson.

An autobiographical account of Stephen Ball's intellectual development is available in the "Acquired Wisdom" section of "Education Review".

== Honours ==
Ball was elected a Fellow of the Royal Society of Arts (FRSA) in 1998, a Fellow of the Academy of Social Sciences (FAcSS) in 2000, and a Fellow of the British Academy (FBA) in 2006.
