= Public sociology =

Subfield of sociology

Public sociology is a subfield of the wider sociological discipline that emphasizes expanding the disciplinary boundaries of sociology in order to engage with non-academic audiences. It is perhaps best understood as a style of sociology rather than a particular method, theory, or set of political values. Since the twenty-first century, the term has been widely associated with University of California, Berkeley sociologist Michael Burawoy, who delivered an impassioned call for a disciplinary embrace of public sociology in his 2004 American Sociological Association (ASA) presidential address. In his address, Burawoy contrasts public sociology with what he terms "professional sociology", a form of sociology that is concerned primarily with addressing other academic sociologists.

Burawoy and other advocates of public sociology encourage the discipline to engage with issues that are of significant public and political concern. These include debates over public policy, political activism, the purposes of social movements, and the institutions of civil society. If public sociology is considered to be a "movement" within the discipline, it is one that aims to revitalize the discipline of sociology by leveraging its empirical methods and theoretical insights to contribute to debates not just about what is or what has been in society, but about what society might yet be. Thus, many versions of public sociology have had an undeniably normative and political character—a fact that has led a significant number of sociologists to oppose the approach.

== History ==
The term "public sociology" was first introduced by Herbert Gans in his 1988 ASA presidential address, "Sociology in America: The Discipline and the Public". For Gans, primary examples of public sociologists included David Riesman, author of The Lonely Crowd (one of the best-selling books of sociology ever to be written), and Robert Bellah, the lead author of another best-selling work, Habits of the Heart. In 2000 (four years before Burawoy's ASA address), sociologist Ben Agger wrote the book Public Sociology: From Social Facts to Literary Acts, which called for a sociology that addressed major public issues.

However, the Northwestern University race scholar Aldon Morris argues in his book The Scholar Denied: W. E. B. Du Bois and the Birth of Modern Sociology (2015) that W. E .B. Du Bois was practicing public sociology long before the term was incorporated into the mainstream disciplinary vocabulary, and that scientific racism prevented Du Bois' contributions from being recognized by the discipline for nearly a century.

Morris argues that Du Bois built the first actual scientific department of sociology during his tenure at Atlanta University, a historically black college, predating the "scientific revolution" of the Chicago school (who are often credited with turning sociology into a rigorous, empirical social science). To Du Bois, robust empirical sociological research was necessary in order to emancipate American blacks from the tyrannies and oppressions built into the racist fabric of American society. Through thorough inductive research, Du Bois sought to dismantle and delegitimize social Darwinist, biological, and cultural deficiency explanations for racial inequality, which were not grounded in empirical evidence, but relied on grand deductive narratives that had no basis in scientific analysis.

Du Bois and his colleagues made use of the scientific method and robust empirical inquiry with the dual goals of turning sociology into a real social science committed to empirical investigation, and using their findings to liberate, empower, and emancipate American blacks from the violence of racist oppression.

Debates over public sociology have rekindled questions concerning the extra-academic purpose of sociology. Public sociology raises questions about what sociology is and what its goals ought to (or even could) be. Such debates (over science and political advocacy, scholarship and public commitment) have a long history in American sociology and in American social science more generally. Historian Mark C. Smith, for instance, has investigated earlier debates over the purpose of social science in his book Social Science in the Crucible: The American Debate over Objectivity and Purpose,1918-1941 (1994), while Stephen P. Turner and Jonathan H. Turner argue in their book, The Impossible Science: An Institutional Analysis of American Sociology (1990), that sociology's search for purpose, through dependence on external publics, has limited the discipline's potential.

== Today ==
While there is no one definition of public sociology, the term has come to be widely associated with Burawoy's particular perspective of sociology. An excerpt from Burawoy's 2004 ASA presidential address provides a succinct summary of his understanding of the term:

"As mirror and conscience of society, sociology must define, promote and inform public debate about deepening class and racial inequalities, new gender regimes, environmental degradation, market fundamentalism, state and non-state violence. I believe that the world needs public sociology - a sociology that transcends the academy - more than ever. Our potential publics are multiple, ranging from media audiences to policy makers, from silenced minorities to social movements. They are local, global, and national. As public sociology stimulates debate in all these contexts, it inspires and revitalizes our discipline. In return, theory and research give legitimacy, direction, and substance to public sociology. Teaching is equally central to public sociology: students are our first public for they carry sociology into all walks of life. Finally, the critical imagination, exposing the gap between what is and what could be, infuses values into public sociology to remind us that the world could be different."

Elsewhere, Burawoy has articulated a vision of public sociology that is consonant with the pursuit of democratic socialism. In Critical Sociology, Burawoy writes:

"We might say that critical engagement with real utopias is today an integral part of the project of sociological socialism. It is a vision of socialism that places human society, or social humanity at its organizing center, a vision that was central to Marx but that was too often lost before it was again picked up by Gramsci and Polanyi. If public sociology is to have a progressive impact it will have to hold itself continuously accountable to some such vision of democratic socialism."

As Mark D. Jacobs and Amy Best write, "The mission of public sociology, in Michael Burawoy's formulation, is to strengthen the institutions of civil society against the encroachments of both state and market." Indeed, Burawoy maintains that, since the last half of the twentieth century and into the twenty first, the political stance of sociology has drifted more leftward, while the all encompassing influence of neoliberalism has dragged the rest of world more rightward. In the aftermath of Reaganomics, the state and market have begun to work in collusion to propagate the ideals of market fundamentalism, replacing the state's role in redistributing resources and providing social welfare services, to one of creating economic opportunities for enterprise. In his view, this will have devastating consequences for civil society, the very subject of sociology itself, unless the discipline embraces his call to unashamedly engage with the world's diverse (and at-risk) publics to achieve some greater good, thus resisting the perverse allure of neoliberalism. One example of this can be seen in the vast increase in adjunct professors in universities and the impact that has had on the inability of professors to publish articles that would give them credence in the eyes of not only publics but also within the discipline itself.

Even in the face of such adversity, many sociologists remain optimistic about the potential latent within sociology to develop an alternative paradigm to the market fundamentalism at the heart of Burawoy's critique. The sociological discipline is dynamic and ever changing, and has a long history of incorporating new theoretical and empirical insights into its analyses, often with the goal of empowering marginalized publics. Indeed, the sociology of work has evolved from processes of adaptation to the study of domination and labor movements; the concepts of stratification theory have shifted from the study of mobility within a hierarchy of occupational prestige, to the examination of changing structures of social and economic inequality along the axes of class, race and gender; the sociology of race has moved from theories of assimilation, to those of political economy, to the study of racial formations; and social theory has allowed, and introduced, more radical interpretations of canonical figures such as Max Weber, Emile Durkheim, and Karl Marx, and has incorporated "subaltern" subfields, such as feminism and ethnic studies, which have had a significant impact on the discipline.

Sociologists have not been alone in debating the public role of social science. Similar debates have occurred recently in the disciplines of economics, political science, anthropology, geography and history, and various sub-disciplines, including political ecology. In an effort to move these various disciplines "toward a more public social science", Craig Calhoun, the President of the Social Science Research Council, has encouraged sociologists and other social scientists to "ask better social science questions about what encourages scientific innovation, what makes knowledge useful, and how to pursue both these agendas, with attention to both immediate needs and long-term capacities. Calhoun has also entered the debate about public sociology, critically evaluating the project of public sociology while acknowledging its specific "promise", and arguing that "how sociology matters in the public sphere is vital to the future of the field".

== Future ==
Following the 2004 annual meeting of the American Sociological Association (ASA), at which Michael Burawoy's vision of public sociology was introduced during his presidential address, there has been continued interest in the topic. In recent years, numerous books and special issues have addressed public sociology, including:

- Public Sociology: Fifteen Eminent Sociologists Debate Politics and the Profession in the Twenty-First Century (2007), edited by Dan Clawson, Robert Zussman, Joya Misra, Naomi Gerstel, Randall Stokes, and Douglas L. Anderton;
- Public Sociologies Reader (2006), edited by Judith Blau and Keri Iyall Smith;
- Public Sociology: The Contemporary Debate (2007), edited by Larry Nichols.
- Public Sociology and Civil Society, Governance, Politics, and Power (2013), by Patricia Mooney Nickel;
- and Public Sociology: From Social Facts to Literary Acts (New Social Formations) (2nd edition, 2007), by Ben Agger.

Building on the conversation sparked by Burawoy in 2004, the 2007 ASA meeting in New York City contained many facets of public sociology. Many of the presentations engaged directly with the public sociology debate, such as: "Constituting a Practical Public Sociology: Reflections on Participatory Research at the Citizenship Project" by Paul Johnston; "A New Public Sociology of Punishment" by Heather Schoenfeld; "What Do Activists Want? Public Sociology for Feminist Scholars of Reproduction" by Danielle Bessett and Christine Morton; and "Developing a Public Sociology: From Lay Knowledge to Civic Intelligence in Health Impact Assessment" by Eva Elliott and Gareth Williams.

Lambros Fatsis' doctoral thesis on public sociology, "Making Sociology Public: A Critical Analysis of an Old Idea and a Recent Debate", can also be recommended as a critical review of the contemporary disciplinary debate about public sociology, incorporating such developments as "e-public sociology" into the scholarly discussion. E-public sociology is a form of public sociology that involves publishing sociological materials in online accessible spaces and subsequent interaction with publics in these spaces.

The debate over public sociology is having far reaching consequences for how many sociology departments teach and do sociology, with several reorienting their programs to encompass elements of public sociology. For example, the sociology department at the University of Minnesota has begun advocating for sociology to claim a larger role in public life, providing "useful, accurate, and scientifically rigorous information to policy makers and community leaders". Similarly, the Department of Sociology and Anthropology at George Mason University began offering a doctoral degree in sociology in the fall of 2008, grounding its two specializations in Institutions and Inequalities and the Sociology of Globalization within a context of public sociological praxis.

In the United Kingdom, too, most institutions that provide undergraduate sociology degrees now advertise the public or "applied" nature of the curriculum (or various key modules that form part of the curriculum). Some examples here would include: Birmingham City University; Queen Margaret University, Edinburgh; Nottingham Trent University; the University of Exeter; Cardiff University; and Bishop Grosseteste University's newly established BA Sociology program.

== Criticism ==
A significant number of those who practice sociology either as public intellectuals or as academic professionals do not subscribe to the specific version of "public sociology" defended by Michael Burawoy or to any version of "public sociology" at all. And in the wake of Burawoy's 2004 Presidency of the American Sociological Association, which put the theme of public sociology in the limelight, the project of public sociology has been vigorously debated on the web, in conversations among sociologists, and in a variety of academic journals.

Specifically, Burawoy's vision of public sociology has been critiqued both by "critical" sociologists and by representatives of academic sociology. These various discussions of public sociology have been included in forums devoted to the subject in academic journals such as Social Problems, Social Forces, Critical Sociology, and the British Journal of Sociology .

Public sociology faces fierce criticism on the grounds of both of its logic and its goals. Its critics claim that it is based on a false premise of consensus in the sociological community, arguing that "it greatly overestimates the uniformity of the moral and political agenda of sociologists". They question the possibility and the desirability of such moral agreement, pointing out that "almost every social issue involves moral dilemmas, not moral clarity. What is or is not 'just' is almost never unambiguous". Others argue that public sociology is based on an uncritical and overly idealistic perception of the public sphere.

Even stronger critiques come from academics who believe that the program of public sociology will unduly politicize the discipline and thus endanger the legitimacy sociology has in the public dialogue. These critics argue that the project of building a reliable body of knowledge about society is fundamentally incompatible with the goals of public sociology: "To the extent that we orient our work around moral principles, we are less likely to attend to theoretical issues. The greater the extent to which we favor particular outcomes, the less able are we to design our work to actually access such outcomes. And the more ideologically oriented our objectives, the less the chance that we can recognize or assimilate contrary evidence. In other words, rather than good professional sociology being mutually interactive with public sociology, I believe that public sociology gets in the way of good professional sociology."

== Applied sociology ==
"Applied sociology" and "sociological practice" (also referred to as policy sociology) has come to refer to intervention using sociological knowledge in an applied setting. Applied sociologists work in a wide variety of settings including universities, government, and private practice, using sociological methods to help communities solve everyday problems, such as improving community policing and crime prevention, evaluating and improving drug courts, assessing the needs of inner city neighborhoods, developing the capacity of an educational system, or promoting the development of housing and related resources for aging populations.

Sociological practice is different from pure academic sociology in which sociologists work in an academic setting such as a university with a teaching and pure research orientation. Although there are some common origins, sociological practice is entirely distinct from social work. An increasing number of universities are attempting to gear curricula toward practical sociology in this way. Clinical sociology courses give students the skills to be able to work effectively with clients, teach basic counseling skills, give knowledge that is useful for careers such as victims assisting and drug rehabilitation, and teach the student how to integrate sociological knowledge with other fields they may go into such as marriage and family therapy, and clinical social work.

As defined by the Applied Social Sciences Forum (ASSF), applied Social Science (ASS) seeks to highlight the processes of social and political transformation taking place in a particular society. It is characterized by the operational aspect of the knowledge it produces. Unlike pure academic knowledge, applied social sciences try to steer the debate towards scientific priorities of social and political reform and accompanying social transformations. From this point of view, the applied social sciences can be seen as complementary knowledge that enrich both the action and the academic sciences.

The objectives of ASS are to deepen reflection on practical issues related to their objective, to support the major decision making in society and enable researchers to support their knowledge and enrich the range of possible solutions.

The "action research" is the framework of choice for applied social sciences. Action research can be defined here as a process that involves further intervention by the researcher beyond the return of a single diagnostic assay type, or inventory.

The researcher may, in this way, have several hats within the same search:

- A role of developer issues, logical actions and issues of different actors,
- An expert who accompanies the action from his methodology and science role
- A facilitator role pilot working groups and aims, as and when the progress of its work, its analyzes to confront the realities of stakeholders power feed,
- A mediator who brings out back and speak different stakeholders of an action system
- A role of facilitator who can help build collective courses of action relevant while remaining outside issues discussed.

The methodological tools of the SSA are:

- Qualitative approaches (different types of interviews and / or collective)
- Quantitative methods using questionnaires and / or literature searches, data processing statistics
- The analysis of practices
- Action research
- Participatory methods

=== Notable applied, public, and clinical sociologists ===
- Jane Addams
- John G. Bruhn
- Elizabeth J. Clark
- Tressie McMillan Cottom
- W. E. B. Du Bois
- Michael Eric Dyson
- Jonathan A. Friedman
- Jan M. Fritz
- Abdelwahab Ben Hafaiedh
- C. Margaret Hall
- Melissa Harris-Perry
- Rand L. Kannenberg
- Roger A. Straus
- Aaron Swartz
- Lester F. Ward
- Cornel West

== See also ==
- Public anthropology
- Sociotherapy
- Sociologists Without Borders, international organization
- Public criminology
