= Anna Tsing =

American anthropologist (born 1952)

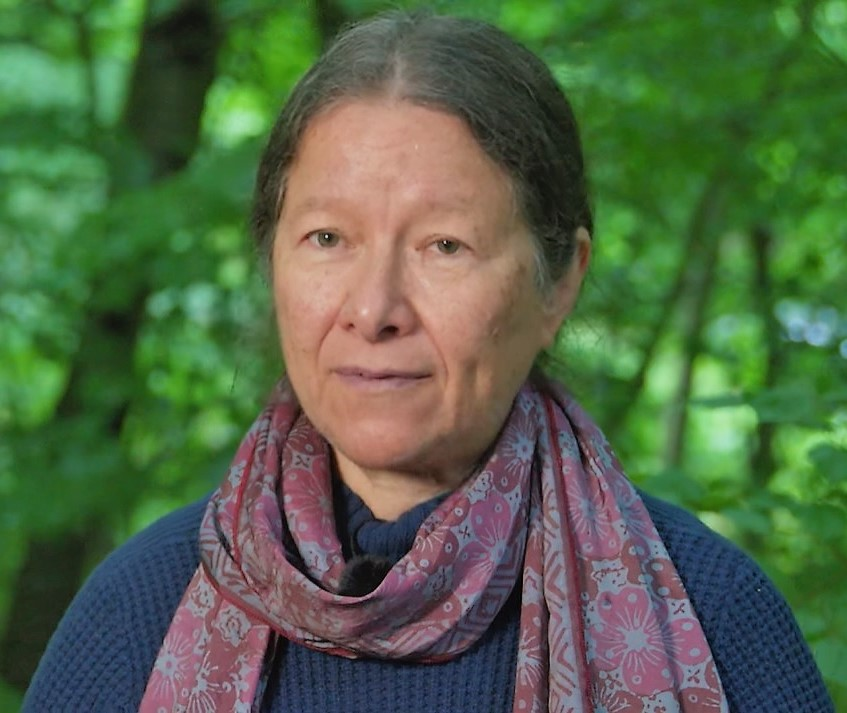
- Born: Anna Lowenhaupt Tsing; 1952 (age 73–74)
- Partner: James C. Scott (1999–2024; his death)
- Awards: Huxley Memorial Medal; Guggenheim Fellowship; Gregory Bateson Prize; Victor Turner Prize

Academic background
- Education: Yale University; Stanford University

Academic work
- Main interests: Feminist studies; The Anthropocene; Globalization
- Notable works: Friction: An Ethnography of Global Connection; The Mushroom at the End of the World

Anna Lowenhaupt Tsing (born 1952) is an American anthropologist. She is a professor in the Anthropology Department at the University of California, Santa Cruz. In 2018, she was awarded the Huxley Memorial Medal of the Royal Anthropological Institute.

== Education ==
Tsing received her B.A. from Yale University and completed her M.A. (1976) and PhD (1984) at Stanford University.

== Career ==
On receiving her doctoral degree, she served as a visiting assistant professor at the University of Colorado, Boulder (1984–86) and as an assistant professor at the University of Massachusetts, Amherst (1986–89). She then joined UC Santa Cruz.

Tsing has published more than 40 articles in prominent journals including Cultural Anthropology and Southeast Asian Studies Bulletin. She won the Harry Benda Prize for her book In the Realm of the Diamond Queen (1994). Her second book, Friction: An Ethnography of Global Connection (2005), was awarded the Senior Book Prize of the American Ethnological Society.

In 2010 she received a Guggenheim Fellowship for her project On the Circulation of Species: The Persistence of Diversity, an ethnography of the matsutake mushroom.

In 2013, Tsing was granted the Niels Bohr Professorship at Aarhus University in Denmark for her contributions to interdisciplinary work in the humanities, natural sciences, social sciences, and the arts. She is currently developing a transdisciplinary program for exploring the Anthropocene. Tsing is director of the AURA (Aarhus University Research on the Anthropocene) research center. The project was funded by the Danish National Research Foundation for a five-year period until 2018.

Among the institutions she is affiliated with are the American Anthropological Association, the American Ethnological Society, and the Association for Asian Studies.

In 1999, Tsing began a relationship with the political scientist and anthropologist James C. Scott, which lasted until his death in 2024.

== Major themes ==
=== Plantationocene ===
Together with scholar Donna J. Haraway, Tsing coined Plantationocene as an alternative term to the proposed epoch Anthropocene that centers humans activities in the transformation of the planet and its negative effect on land use, ecosystems, biodiversity, and species extinction.

Tsing and Haraway point out that not all humans equally contribute to the environmental challenges facing our planet. They date the origin of the Anthropocene to the start of colonialism in the Americas in the early modern era and highlight the violent history behind it by focusing on the history of plantations. The Spanish and the Portuguese colonists started importing models of plantations to the Americas by the 1500s which they had previously developed a century earlier in the Atlantic Islands. These models of plantation were based on migratory forced labor (slavery), intensive land usage, globalized commerce, and constant racialized violence, which have all transformed the lives of humans and non-humans worldwide. Current and past plantations have been important nodes in the histories of colonialism, capitalism, and racism—histories inseparable from environmental issues that made some humans more than others vulnerable to warming temperatures, rising seawater levels, toxicants, and land disposition.

== Notable works ==
Some of Tsing's notable work comprise the following books:

- In the Realm of the Diamond Queen: Marginality in an Out-of-the-way Place (1993)

Anna Tsing's first book centers around individuals from Meratus Dayak, from South Kalimantan, Indonesia. Tsing's key informant is Uma Adang, who provides her insight into shamanism, politics and the mythology in relation to ethnic identity. The book focuses on the topic of marginality within a state and the context of community within a gendered framework.

- Friction: An Ethnography of Global Connection (2004)

Tsing's ethnography is based in the Meratus Mountains of South Kalimantan, a province in Indonesia. The term friction is described as, "the awkward, unequal, unstable, and creative qualities of interconnection across difference." This ethnography was based on short-term, consecutive instances of field work; the methods are based on "ethnographic fragments". The book is a study on human dominated landscapes, running themes include corporate exploitation, globalization, environmental activism, and environmental degradation. Friction has become a standard text in graduate seminars in geography, sociology, critical theory, feminist studies, environmental studies, and political economy, among other areas.
From her research, Tsing is able to conceptualize friction as an alternative theory to the simple “development of a globalized society”. Tsing critiques this paradigm as it stems from an imperialist point of view, where development is framed as becoming more similar to powerful nations and is linked to morality. The idea of the “globe” is something difficult to measure and study and creates a dichotomy between societies considered part of the global community. Tsing begins by explaining how illogical trends in Indonesian land management seem despite the fact that the population and demands for infrastructure do not seem to be increasing on a local level. The issue of this deforestation led to increased solidarity and conversation between urban and rural communities in Indonesia. Tsing points out that part of the reason for the unity of different Indonesian communities over this issue was that none of these communities were benefiting from the destruction of these forests as they were to create goods for foreign powers. As protesters argue, this environmental destruction does not align with the positive imagination of the global movement. Instead, Tsing writes, it reveals how power and inequality are reflected in destruction of natural resources and the activism in response to those actions. Tsing argues that the current paradigm of globalization theory is that all global interactions are done in the goal of creating a global era. By instead describing global and cultural interactions across difference as “friction”, Tsing acknowledges the effects that these interactions have on the trajectory of societies without attaching morality or monolithic view points to them. Tsing also suggests that using the concept of friction to understand the impacts of interaction rids the perception that the power of globalization is a uniform and inevitable process. It takes away some of the power in the way we speak about globalization by acknowledging that the concept is “messy” and does not always create changes in the same way. Tsing’s conceptualization of friction as a description for interaction on the global scale offers a new way to understand how diverse the effects of these interactions can be on different worlds.

- The Mushroom at the End of the World: On the Possibility of Life in Capitalist Ruins (2015)

Tsing's ethnographic account of the matsutake mushroom gives the readers a look into this rare, prized and expensive fungus, much appreciated in Japan. The mushroom sprouts in landscapes that have been considerably changed by people, in symbiosis with certain species of pine trees. Tsing's account of the matsutake contributes to the field of anthropology in her ability to study multi-species interactions, using the non-human subject to glean more about the human world.
Tsing follows its international journey in order to give the reader insight into the mushroom's complex commodity chain connecting to meditations on capitalism. She uses it to shed light on broader themes about how ecology is shaped by human interference, and to discuss the meaning of being human in relation with other species. The book was awarded the Gregory Bateson Prize and the Victor Turner Prize.

- Arts of Living on a Damaged Planet: Ghosts and Monsters of the Anthropocene (2017)
