= The Mushroom at the End of the World =

2015 book by anthropologist Anna Tsing

- Author: Anna Tsing
- Language: English
- Subject: Capitalism, Commodity chain, Matsutake, Anthropocene
- Genre: Anthropology
- Published: 2015
- Publisher: Princeton University Press
- Publication place: United States
- Media type: Print
- Pages: 352
- ISBN: 9781400873548

The Mushroom at the End of the World: On the Possibility of Life in Capitalist Ruins is a 2015 book by the Chinese American anthropologist Anna Lowenhaupt Tsing. The book describes and analyzes the globalized commodity chains of matsutake mushrooms.

== Content ==
The Mushroom at the End of the World uses the matsutake as a focal point for exploring what Tsing describes as the end of capitalist progress as ecological degradation and economic precarity proliferate in the 21st century. The matsutake is considered a delicacy and thrives in human-disturbed forests, foraged by humans in locales as diverse as Oregon, Yunnan, and Lapland. In the book, Tsing follows foragers as they search for matsutakes, the traders who buy and sell them, and the Japanese consumers who especially prize them, largely as gifts.

Tsing highlights both the resilience of the matsutake, which humans have found cannot be cultivated, and the entanglements between and co-dependency of various species — or multi-species "assemblages" — in not only surviving precarious and disturbed environments, but in creating new environments. On such assemblages, Tsing writes:

…one could say that pines, matsutake, and humans all cultivate each other unintentionally. They make each other’s world-making projects possible. This idiom has allowed me to consider how landscapes more generally are products of unintentional design, that is, the overlapping world-making activities of many agents, human and not human. The design is clear in the landscape’s ecosystem. But none of the agents have planned this effect. Humans join others in making land-scapes of unintentional design. As sites for more-than-human dramas, landscapes are radical tools for decentering human hubris. Landscapes are not backdrops for historical action: they are themselves active. Watching landscapes in formation shows humans joining other living beings in shaping worlds.

The author draws on these themes not only to critique capitalism, but also to refute the notion of the utility of a single, "unitary critique" of capitalism, arguing instead for the importance of diverse and contingent responses. Tsing writes that "[t]o understand capitalism (and not just its alternatives)… we can’t stay inside the logics of capitalists; we need an ethnographic eye to see the economic diversity through which accumulation is possible."

== Awards and recognition ==
The Mushroom at the End of the World has won numerous awards including the 2016 Victor Turner Prize in Ethnographic Writing from the Society for Humanistic Anthropology and the 2016 Gregory Bateson Book Prize from the Society for Cultural Anthropology. The book was also named a Kirkus Reviews and Times Higher Education best book of 2015.

== Criticism ==
Natalia Cecire and Sam Solomon offer a mixed assessment of Tsing's Mushroom at the End of the World, praising it as a careful account of fungi in relation to capitalism, but questioning the wider discourse of "mycoaesthetics" in which it participates. Cecire and Solomon argue that in recent years the fantasy of a "fungal fix" has drawn on the abundance, resilience, and networked character of fungi in ways that conceal the fundamentally exploitative and ecologically devastating nature of capitalism.

== Reviews ==
- Bell, Joshua A. (2017). "The Mushroom at the End of the World: On the Possibility of Life in Capitalist Ruins by Anna Lowenhaupt Tsing". Anthropological Quarterly. 90 (1): 277–282. doi:10.1353/anq.2017.0011. ISSN 1534-1518. S2CID 151793991.
- Cons, Jason (2016). "The Mushroom at the End of the World: On the Possibility of Life in Capitalist Ruins". The Journal of Asian Studies. 75 (3): 798–800. doi:10.1017/s0021911816000656. ISSN 0021-9118.
- Helmreich, Stefan (2016). "The Mushroom at the End of the World: On the Possibility of Life in Capitalist Ruins". American Ethnologist. 43 (3): 570–572. doi:10.1111/amet.12356. ISSN 0094-0496.
- Kim, Eleana J. (2017). "The Arts of Noticing: The Mushroom at the End of the World: On the Possibility of Life in Capitalist Ruins". Current Anthropology. 58 (1): 138–140. doi:10.1086/690139. ISSN 0011-3204. S2CID 152220986.
- Padwe, Jonathan (2018). "The mushroom at the end of the world: on the possibility of life in capitalist ruins". The Journal of Peasant Studies. 46 (2): 433–437. doi:10.1080/03066150.2018.1492777. ISSN 0306-6150. S2CID 158146861.
- Pham, Yamoi (2016). "The Mushroom at the End of the World: On the Possibility of Life in Capitalist Ruins". East Asian Science, Technology and Society. 11 (4): 613–616. doi:10.1215/18752160-3667933. ISSN 1875-2160.
- Sullivan, Sian (2018). "On possibilities for salvaged polyphonic ecologies in a ruined world" (PDF). Dialogues in Human Geography. 8 (1): 69–72. doi:10.1177/2043820617738835. ISSN 2043-8206. S2CID 145037994.
