= Rachel Sherman =

Rachel Sherman may refer to:

- Rachel Sherman (author) (born 1975), American author
- Rachel Sherman (sociologist), American sociologist and labor historian
- Rachel Sherman, daughter of American Civil War General William T. Sherman
