= Global Value Chains and Development =

2018 book by Gary Gereffi

- Cover
- Author: Gary Gereffi
- Original title: Global Value Chains and Development: Redefining the Contours of 21st Century Capitalism
- Language: English
- Series: Development Trajectories in Global Value Chains
- Subject: Global Value Chains, economic development, multi-national corporations (MNCs), globalization, governance, international business, competitiveness
- Genre: Non-fiction
- Publisher: Cambridge University Press
- Publication date: September 10, 2018
- Publication place: United Kingdom, United States, Australia, India, Singapore
- Pages: 494
- ISBN: 978-1108458863
- Preceded by: The pharmaceutical industry and dependency in the third world

Global Value Chains and Development: Redefining the Contours of 21st Century Capitalism is a 2018 book by American economic sociologist and academic Gary Gereffi published by Cambridge University Press and part of their Development Trajectories in Global Value Chains series. The book discusses the Global Value Chains (GVC) framework, pioneered by Gereffi in the mid-1990s and early 2000s. It focuses on how buyer-driven supply chains, led by retailers and global brands, shifted production in many international industries to low-cost developing economies. The GVC framework revolves around "governance" (supply chain control) and "upgrading" (strategic positioning in global industries). The chapters include key articles on global commodity chains and case studies on Mexico's and China's impact on the U.S. manufacturing sector. The concept of "social upgrading" and "synergistic governance" emerged to address social concerns. The rise of emerging economies led to greater regionalization of GVCs in the 2000s. After the 2008-09 economic crisis, GVCs adapted to a post-Washington-Consensus world marked by economic nationalism and populism. The GVC approach has influenced policymakers in international organizations and national economies, as well as academics.

== Overview ==
The book consists of a foreword by Pascal Lamy, a new introduction by Gereffi himself, and fourteen chapters. Each chapter is either an essay written solely by Gereffi, or an essay co-written by Gereffi collaborating with other scholars. Most of the essays have been published before in various academic journals from 1994 to 2016. (Note: Chapters 11 and 12 were commissioned by international organizations, and chapters 1 and 15 are original to this volume.) Apart from the introduction, there are seven chapters in the book solely written by Gereffi—namely chapters 2, 3, 5, 7, 12, 14, and 15. The other seven chapters were written by Gereffi in collaboration with various leading scholars in the field, including John Humphrey, Timothy J. Sturgeon, Jennifer Bair, Stephanie Barrientos, Arianna Rossi, Frederick Mayer, Joonkoo Lee, Karina Fernandez-Stark, and Xubei Luo.

Many of these chapters are among the most highly cited articles in the GVC field. Chapter 4 (“The governance of global value chains,” co-authored by Gereffi, Humphrey and Sturgeon) is the top-cited GVC article with over 11,000 Google Scholar citations; chapters 2 and 3 have over 5,000 citations each; and chapters 5, 6, 8, 11 and 14 each have over 1,000 citations. (Note: These Google Scholar citations are as of January 11, 2024)

=== Summary ===
==== Foreword ====
Former Director-General of the World Trade Organization Pascal Lamy wrote the foreword to the book. Lamy emphasized the evolution of global trade from a national production focus (the old world of 20th century trade) to the transnational supply chains emphasized in Gereffi's book (the new world of 21st century trade). He discussed his efforts at the WTO to transition trade negotiations to the realities of global supply chains and highlighted Gereffi's pivotal role in shaping a new narrative on global trade and development. Lamy applauded the book's accessible language, making it valuable for diverse audiences, and he underscored the concept of governance, involving both private entities and public authorities, in achieving social, environmental, and economic goals. Lamy concluded by stressing the need for inclusive frameworks that address the diverse interests of citizens, businesses, policymakers, and others to navigate the dramatic shifts in the world economy.

==== Introduction ====
Chapter 1 provides an intellectual history of the multifaceted origins of the GVC framework. The idea of GVCs did not have a single source. While there are connections to the notions of “commodity chain” introduced by Immanuel Wallerstein and “value chain” analyzed by Michael Porter, the GVC framework included distinctive elements that differentiated it from previous paradigms. The emphasis on the power of lead firms in global industries (which gave rise to the analysis of “governance structures”) and the development emphasis of many GVC researchers (highlighting the economic, social and environmental upgrading trajectories of countries) produced a unique amalgam of research questions and analytical tools. The Rockefeller Foundation-sponsored “Global Value Chains Initiative” in the early 2000s provided the catalyst for a GVC framework that was field-research driven, interdisciplinary, broadly comparative, and with a strong policy orientation.

==== Part I – Foundations of the GVC framework ====
In chapter 2, Gereffi introduces the concept of industry "governance structures" to the literature on global commodity chains (GCCs). This is done through the novel contrast between producer-driven and buyer-driven commodity chains. Governance structures, in this context, refer to the influence wielded by various lead firms, including manufacturers, retailers, and brands. To illustrate the dynamics of buyer-driven chains, the study utilizes the apparel commodity chain as a case example.

Chapter 3 unveils a network-oriented perspective on "industrial upgrading," which quickly became a core concept in the GCC and GVC literatures. The focus is on the garment sector within the emerging economies of East Asia, specifically Hong Kong, Taiwan, and South Korea. The progression of industrial upgrading is articulated through four distinct phases: assembly, original equipment manufacturing (OEM), original brand manufacturing (OBM), and original design manufacturing (ODM). Organizational learning and triangle manufacturing are pivotal mechanisms in shaping East Asia's export roles.

In chapter 4, industry “governance structures” are a theoretical pillar for contemporary GVC studies. The original article on "The governance of global value chains" is the most widely cited piece in the GVC literature, with over 11,000 citations on Google Scholar as of January 2024. The article builds on insights from three distinct bodies of literature: transaction cost economics; production networks; and technological capability coupled with firm-level learning. Five distinct types of GVC governance are discussed: hierarchy, captive, relational, modular, and market.

==== Part II – Governance and upgrading in global value chains ====
Chapter 5 reviews a variety of theoretical frameworks used by scholars to study the international economy. Special attention is placed on the pivotal role of transnational corporations (TNCs), as well as the emergence of global production networks and GVCs in reshaping the landscape of production and trade on a global scale. The notion of industrial upgrading is clearly defined and supported by empirical illustrations.

In chapter 6, a clear connection is drawn between the GVC framework and the performance of local industrial clusters. It examines the impact of the North American Free Trade Agreement (NAFTA) established in 1994 on the evolution of blue jeans export cluster in Torreon, Mexico, which displaced El Paso, Texas as the top blue jeans export hub in North America. The blue jeans industry shifted from a producer-driven chain led by U.S. branded manufacturers like Levi Strauss and Co. to a buyer-driven chain that supplied U.S. retailers and brand marketers, such as J.C. Penney and The Gap.

In chapter 7, Gereffi analyzes the export-driven economic development strategies pursued by China and Mexico on the global stage. Mexico, historically emblematic of the neoliberal "Washington Consensus" development model, relied heavily on foreign direct investment, extensive privatization, and open markets. In contrast, China achieved remarkable foreign capital influx and export growth by adopting a more strategic and statist approach to its development. A pivotal element contributing to China's success are "supply-chain cities" that enabled China to realize both economies of scale and scope within GVCs.

Chapter 8 develops a framework for analyzing the linkages between the economic upgrading of firms and the social upgrading of workers. Although firm upgrading does not necessarily lead to improvements for workers, the chapter outlines different trajectories and scenarios of economic and social upgrading with a particular focus on the Moroccan garment industry.

Chapter 9 reviews corporate codes of conduct and other voluntary non-governmental forms of "private governance" that proliferated in the first two decades of the 21st century. While private governance has had some notable successes, its effectiveness depends on four main factors: 1) the structure of the GVC in which production takes place; 2) the extent to which demand for a firm's products relies on its brand identity; 3) the possibilities for collective action by consumers, workers, or other activists to exert pressure on producers; and 4) the extent to which commercial interests of lead firms align with social and environmental concerns.

Chapter 10 examines the role that corporate social responsibility (CSR) plays within industrial clusters and GVCs. A novel concept of "synergistic governance" is introduced, emphasizing a convergence of private governance (embodied in corporate codes of conduct and monitoring), social governance (manifested through civil society pressure from labor organizations and non-governmental entities), and public governance (encompassing governmental policies designed to support advancements by labor groups and environmental activists).

==== Part III – Policy issues and challenges ====
Chapter 11 includes a guide to the key conceptual and empirical building blocks of the GVC framework. The chapter illustrates how the GVC framework was applied in research conducted by Duke University's Global Value Chains Center. This center is recognized for GVC analysis for national governments, international development agencies, nongovernmental organizations (NGOs), and civil society groups.

Chapter 12 focuses on the new roles that emerging economies play within GVCs. Throughout the 2000s, they became significant exporters of both intermediate and final manufactured goods, exemplified by countries like China, South Korea, and Mexico, as well as primary product exporters such as Brazil, Russia, and South Africa. This resulted in a significant expansion of South-South trade between developing economies, especially in the aftermath of the 2008–09 economic recession. China embodies both facets of this evolution. It stands as the world's leading exporter of manufactured goods and also the largest global importer of various raw materials, thereby fuelling the upswing in primary product exports.

Chapter 13 investigates the obstacles and risks faced by businesses, workers, and local communities in the worldwide context. Different pathways for economic and social advancement are identified, along with governmental interventions that seek to navigate risks while retaining the advantages of participating in GVCs.

Chapter 14 assesses GVCs in the contemporary post-Washington Consensus era. It highlights the organizational streamlining and geographical consolidation of GVCs, and the evolving patterns of strategic coordination among value chain participants. With the escalation of South-South trade, the emergence of new end markets, and the swift adoption of the GVC framework by international organizations, national development paradigms will shift.

Chapter 15 links GVCs to the recent rise of economic nationalism and populist politics. From the onset of the U.S.-China trade war in the initial days of the Donald Trump administration to subsequent U.S. trade conflicts with Mexico, Canada and key members of the European Union (E.U.), there has been an escalating protectionist backlash to the pro-trade and foreign direct investment form of globalization associated with GVCs. Current policies in the U.S. and E.U. are focused on revitalizing vulnerable supply chains, restoring manufacturing jobs, and addressing the challenges of advanced manufacturing, regional value chains, and the digital economy. Protectionism does not imply deglobalization, as some argue, but GVC reconfigurations will likely result in altered patterns of globalization.

== Reception ==
In his review, Ari Van Assche (Note: The co-founder of the International Institute of Economic Diplomacy at HEC Montréal) commended Gereffi's work as a leading thinker on GVCs. The review highlighted the book's exploration of the GVC framework's historical development, with a focus on Gereffi's foundational contributions and their impact on policy perspectives. Gereffi's emphasis on governance and upgrading as crucial pillars in the GVC framework were acknowledged, along with the expansion of the framework to include noncorporate stakeholders and policy implications. Van Assche appreciated Gereffi's advocacy for a GVC-oriented industrial policy, which combines liberalized trade with proactive strategies for managing relations between domestic and foreign firms. The review noted a potential limitation in the book's emphasis on theory building over empirical testing, pointing to areas for future research in the GVC literature.

Rory Horner from the University of Manchester stressed Gereffi's seminal work on GVCs and its widespread recognition and significance in understanding global trade. Horner recommended the introductory chapter for insight into the genealogy of GVC research and applauded the book's relevance for students, researchers, policymakers, and civil society, foreseeing its enduring importance in comprehending globalization dynamics.

In their review, Sarah E. McWilliam and Bo Bernhard Nielsen praised Gereffi's work on GVCs and development, highlighting his role as a founder of the GVC framework. They emphasized the book's interdisciplinary appeal, making it suitable for academics, policymakers, and practitioners. The review noted the book's three main parts, focusing on the foundations of GVC theory, governance and upgrading, and policy issues and challenges. While recognizing the book's theoretical contributions, they pointed out three unanswered questions related to lead firms, the geographic scope of GVCs, and the operationalization of GVC governance theory. Nevertheless, McWilliam and Nielsen concluded that the book is a must-have primer offering a comprehensive overview of the field and encouraging scholars to bridge divides between research, policy, and practice.
