= Ivor Goodson =

Educationalist and teacher

Ivor Goodson FAcSS
- Born: Ivor Frederick Goodson; 1943 (age 82–83); Woodley, Berkshire, England

Academic background
- Education: University College, London; University of Sussex
- Thesis: School Subjects and Curriculum Conflict, 1895–1975 (1980)

Academic work
- Discipline: Education
- Institutions: University of Sussex; University of Western Ontario; University of East Anglia; University of Brighton
- Website: ivorgoodson.com

Ivor Frederick Goodson FAcSS (born 1943) is a British educationalist. He is a professor at Tallinn University.

== Education and career ==
Goodson was born in 1943 in Woodley, a village near Reading, Berkshire. He went to a grammar school and was unsuccessful initially, leaving at age 15, but then returned and resumed his studies. He received a Bachelor of Science degree from University College, London, and his teachers certificate from the London School of Education. He then worked as a teacher at the progressive comprehensive school, Countesthorpe Community College.

Goodson returned to the University of Sussex for a Doctor of Philosophy degree, which he completed in 1979. He remained at Sussex for several years, before moving the University of Western Ontario in 1986, and to the University of East Anglia in 1996. In 2004, he became the Professor of Learning Theory at the University of Brighton. As of 2015, he is a professor at Tallinn University, Estonia.

He was the co-editor-in-chief and founder of the Journal of Education Policy, alongside Stephen Ball.

== Books ==
Goodson's books include:

- School Subjects and Curriculum Change (Croom Helm, 1983; 3rd ed., Falmer Press, 1993)
- The Making Of The Curriculum: Collected Essays (Falmer Press, 1988; 3rd ed., 2004)
- Studying Curriculum (Open University Press, 1994)
- Studying School Subjects: A Guide (with Colin J. Marsh, Falmer Press, 1996)
- The Changing Curriculum: Studies in Social Construction (Peter Lang Publishing, 1997)
- Learning, Curriculum and Life Politics: The Selected Works of Ivor F. Goodson (Routledge, 2005)
- Developing Narrative Theory: Life Histories and Personal Representation (Routledge, 2013)
- Critical Narrative as Pedagogy (with Scherto Gill, Bloomsbury, 2014)
- Democracy, Education and Research: The Struggle for Public Life (with John Schostak, Routledge 2019).
- Happiness, Flourishing and the Good Life: A Transformative Vision of Human Well Being (with Garett Thomson, and Scherto Gill, Routledge, 2020).

He is also an editor or co-editor of several edited volumes.

== Awards and honours ==
- 2020 A festschrift volume in Goodson's honour was published.
- 2019 Fellow of the Academy of Social Sciences (FAcSS).
- 2018 Awarded John Nisbet Fellowship Award by British Educational Research Association for outstanding contribution to educational research over his career.
- 2007 Awarded an honorary doctorate by the University of Gothenburg.
