= Sociologists Without Borders =

Founded in Madrid in 2001, Sociologists Without Borders/Sociólogos Sin Fronteras (SSF) is a Non-Governmental Organization that advances a cosmopolitan sociology and its activities are considered to be public sociology. The organization has active chapters in Brazil, Chile, Italy, Spain the U.S., Canada, and Iran. The Spanish and U.S. chapters each have international members. Each of the chapters has regular meetings and organizes sessions at national sociological conferences, and there is an affiliated online, peer-reviewed journal.

== Overview ==
The group's central pedagogical aim is to develop a globally inclusive sociological curriculum. Its epistemological premise is that human rights and collective goods (including sustainable natural resources and participatory democracy) are two aspects of the same concept.

As Sociologists, the group advances human rights by working through communities, societies, the workplace, and other social institutions. They advance the right to decent employment, social security, education, housing, food security, health care, the rights to cultural, racial, religious, and to an identity and sexual preference. Human rights also includes gender equality and the principle that vulnerable groups need special protections, including children, the aged, the disabled, oppressed racial and ethnic minorities, migrants, and indigenous peoples. These principles are drawn from the Universal Declaration of Human Rights (1948) that recognizes "the inherent dignity" and "the equal and inalienable rights of all members of the human family," from various United Nations Educational, Scientific, and Cultural Organization's treaties and declarations on culture.

Human rights are realized with the advance and protection of common (collective) goods, including a sustainable environment, transparent laws and government, natural resources, the internet and information grids, fair trade, food sovereignty (the rights of farmers and fishers to manage their own resources), and participatory democracy. Indeed, human rights are themselves common goods because they are indivisible and inclusive.

The group's framework is considered utopian, and Sociologists Without Borders takes the view that this is necessary in a world in crisis: wars, civil strife, diminishing environmental resources, epidemics, and the growing economic gap between the Global North and the Global South. What this pessimistic account leaves out, and what Sociologists without Borders stresses, is that there are growing interdependencies and solidarities around the world and these draw less from nation-states than they do from the capabilities and resourcefulness of ordinary people.

== The SSF Think Tank ==
On July 25, 2008, the SSF US Chapter released an online discussion platform for reflection and discussion among concerned sociologists, other social scientists, NGOs, governments, academics, students, activists, journalists, and individuals who want to discover and hopefully help fight the "Challenges to Human Rights" in a global environment. This has since been taken over by The Development Cafe and is now run as Global Sociology Network, independent of the SSF.

== 2010 Arizona Boycott ==
In response to Arizona SB 1070, SSF petitioned Arizona Governor Jan Brewer to roll back the law, stating: "SSF believes that Arizona Law SB1070 is a form of racial profiling and discrimination because officers will likely rely on appearance, phenotypes, language and accents to make judgments that will lead to the unnecessary harassment or detention of US citizens and residents, including SSF members and other Sociologists." SSF began a boycott of public and private entities within Arizona and encouraged their members not to travel to the state.

== Members and Office Bearers ==
- Davita Silfen Glasberg, President, US Chapter
- Lisa Hajjar, Vice President, US Chapter
- Mark Frezzo, Past Vice President, US Chapter
- David Brunsma, Treasurer, US Chapter
- Molly Talcott, Secretary, US Chapter
- Autumn McClellan, Administrative Manager, US Chapter
- April Stapp, Graduate Student Representative, US Chapter
- Societies Without Borders Journal Editors: David Brunsma, Mark Frezzo, Keri Iyall Smith
- Representatives to American Association for the Advancement of Science: Judith Blau, Mark Frezzo, Jerry Krase (Alternate)
- Beatrice and Sidney Award Committee: Gran (Chair), Joe Feagin, Walda Katz-Fishman, Judith Wittner
- ASA Liaison: Louis Esparza
- Poet Laureate: Rodney Coates
- Ali Tayefi, President, Iran Chapter

== See also ==
- Doctors Without Borders
