= Sociotherapy =

Sociotherapy is a social science and form of social work, and sociology that involves the study of groups of people, its constituent individuals, and their behavior, using learned information in case and care management towards holistic life enrichment or improvement of social and life conditions.

The professional practitioner of the field, who may be called a sociotherapist or life enrichment therapist, sometimes called a clinical sociologist, is usually concurrently a member of another relevant profession: medical doctor, psychiatrist, psychologist, nurse, social worker, sociologist, criminologist, activity and recreational professionals, among others. Clinical sociotherapy usually targets groups of children, youths, or elderly, employed in various settings such as treatment facilities or lifecare communities like nursing homes and are directly involved in case management and care planning.

== Professional definition ==
Still in its infancy as a social science and profession, sociotherapy is ill-defined and thus takes many forms, according to the respective definitions created by the individual therapists, firms and institutions that employ sociotherapists and life enrichment therapists. The Society for the Furtherance of Sociotherapy defines sociotherapy as "the methodical management of the living environment of a group of clients, directed towards reaching the treatment targets of this group—and conceived as a means of achieving the treatment targets of the individual client—within a functional unit, usually in a clinical treatment setting." This definition is most accepted especially in lifecare communities such as nursing homes.

The Sociotherapy Association in the United States describes a sociotherapy that emphasizes the support of awareness, relationship, and the integration of life and the environment. Its main focus is the process of interpersonal relationships as a method of facilitating healthier living, rather than diagnosing intrapsychic psychopathology, and attempting to change it through coercion and analysis (psychology and psychotherapy). The Society for the Furtherance of Sociotherapy says: "Sociotherapy operates through a holistic vision of mankind. That is to say that the human being is seen as a somatic, psychic, social and spiritual unity, which is unique because of his own history of growth."

Definition of sociotherapy as a social science and profession is also based on regional dicta. For example, the public health insurance system of Germany offered a uniquely German definition in order to subsidize treatment by sociotherapeutic professionals. It said that sociotherapy "designates non-medical, social, and work-related components of the care process".

Sociotherapy has been used in the treatment and education of adolescents at Kanner Academy and Community Schools in Sarasota Florida US. In These settings the working definition of sociotherapy is the practice of promoting healthy growth and living by facilitating therapeutic communities, personal relationships and positive peer culture. It is better known as the "relationship therapy".

Rand L. Kannenberg wrote, "Sociotherapy for Sociopaths: Resocial Group". Designed by the author to help prevent relapse and rearrest of parolees and probationers at a community mental health center in 1986, this text outlines an evidence-based, twenty-four session group program created for adult clients with coexisting Substance Use Disorders and the persistent problems of aggressiveness, breaking rules and laws, carelessness, dishonesty, impulsivity, indifference, irresponsibility and irritability. The book examines the importance of sociotherapy or sociological counseling in the corrections and substance abuse fields. "Kannenberg's fresh approach to treating psychoactive chemical abusing sociopaths should be in every counselor's arsenal when treating a client of this nature."

== Credentialing professionals ==
The Sociotherapy Association is certifying sociotherapists and support companions.

== Developing methods and theories ==
=== Practice ===
The foundation of any sociotherapeutic relationship include the practice of dialogical relationship, the phenomenological method, field-theoretical strategies, experimental freedom, countertransference (CT) management.

Support Companionship is a time tested method for helping people, who for one reason or another, are struggling in their lives. Support Companions provide wrap-around support to adults, adolescents, families, the elderly, children, and service providers, when the support is needed! The foundation of support companion services is relationship, and the methodology of contact is sociotherapy.

Sociotherapists are constantly involved in creating and refining theories in group and socialization dynamics. For example, a sociotherapist in a nursing home may experiment on the various methods one might employ to lure an introverted resident to activities and thus reduce the resident's risk of social isolation, which may be linked to the continued progression of that resident's dementia. In this example, the sociotherapist would also use activities like games and exercises to monitor an individual's mental health and use interaction with other residents as a tool to improve that mental health.

=== Phenomenological method ===
The goal of a phenomenological exploration is awareness. In Sociotherapy awareness and integration are central to healthy living. Much of the practice is centered around ways to support and improve a sense of awareness in our fields of experience. This is accomplished with relationship, experimentation and phenomenological exploration.

The phenomenological method comprises three steps: (1) the rule of epoché, (2) the rule of description, and (3) the rule of horizontalization.

Applying the rule of epoché we set aside our personal initial biases and prejudices in order to suspend expectations and assumptions. Applying the rule of description, one occupies oneself with describing instead of explaining. Applying the rule of horizontalization one treats each item of description as having equal value or significance.

When it comes to a socio-therapeutic relationship the rule of epoché sets aside any initial theories with regard to what is presented in the meeting between therapist and client. The rule of description implies immediate and specific observations, abstaining from interpretations or explanations, especially those formed from the application of any clinical theory superimposed over the circumstances of experience. The rule of horizontalization avoids any hierarchical assignment of importance such that the data of experience become prioritized and categorized as they are received.

As envisioned by Husserl, phenomenology is a method of philosophical inquiry that rejects the rationalist bias that has dominated Western thought since Plato in favor of a method of reflective attentiveness that discloses the individual's "lived experience".

=== Intersubjectivity ===
Intersubjectivity emphasizes that shared understanding and consensus is essential in the shaping of our ideas, experiencing, and relations. Language, quintessentially, is viewed as communal rather than private. Therefore, it is problematic to view the individual as partaking in a private world, one which has a meaning defined apart from any other subjects. But in our shared divergence from a commonly understood experience, these private worlds naturally emerge.

== See also ==
- Public sociology
