= Michael Burawoy =

American sociologist (1947–2025)

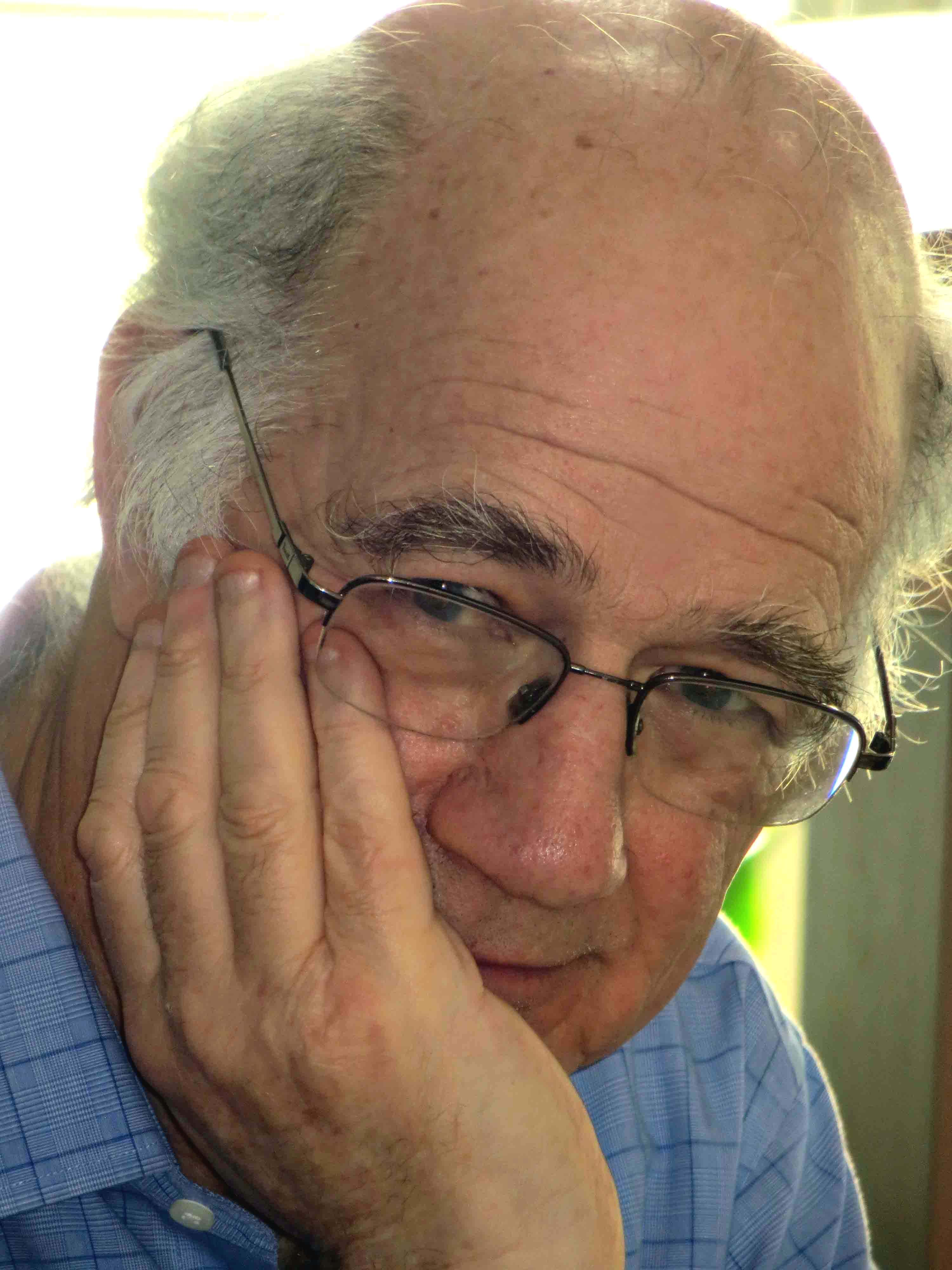
- Born: 15 June 1947; England
- Died: 3 February 2025 (aged 77); Oakland, California, U.S.

Academic background
- Education: University of Cambridge (1968); University of Zambia (1972); University of Chicago (PhD 1976)
- Thesis: Making Out on the Shop Floor (1976)
- Doctoral advisor: William Julius Wilson
- Influences: Alvin Gouldner; Antonio Gramsci; Imre Lakatos; Adam Przeworski; Jaap van Velsen

Academic work
- Discipline: Sociology
- Sub-discipline: Industrial sociology; public sociology; social theory
- School or tradition: Marxism
- Institutions: University of California, Berkeley
- Doctoral students: Pierrette Hondagneu-Sotelo; Ruth Milkman; Robyn Rodriguez; Rachel Sherman; Ronald Weitzer
- Notable works: Manufacturing Consent (1979); "For Public Sociology" (2004); The Extended Case Method (2009)
- Notable ideas: Extended case method; public sociology; policy sociology
- Influenced: Luke Bretherton
- Website: burawoy.berkeley.edu

Michael Burawoy (/ˈbɜːrəwɔɪ/; 15 June 1947 – 3 February 2025) was an American sociologist who worked within Marxist social theory, best known as the leading proponent of public sociology and the author of Manufacturing Consent: Changes in the Labor Process Under Monopoly Capitalism—a study on the sociology of industry that has been translated into a number of languages.

Burawoy was a professor of sociology at the University of California, Berkeley. He was president of the American Sociological Association in 2004. In 2006–2010, he was one of the vice-presidents for the Committee of National Associations of the International Sociological Association (ISA). In the XVII ISA World Congress of Sociology he was elected the 17th President of the ISA for the period 2010–2014.

== Life and career ==
Burawoy was born in England on 15 June 1947; his parents had fled Russia and Ukraine, met as students in Leipzig (both having doctorates in chemistry) and arrived in Britain in 1933. He was educated at Manchester Grammar School and Christ's College, Cambridge, graduating with a degree in mathematics in 1968, before going on to pursue postgraduate study in the newly independent African nation of Zambia while simultaneously working as a researcher for Anglo American PLC. Completing a master's degree at the University of Zambia in 1972, Burawoy enrolled as a doctoral student at the University of Chicago, finishing a sociology dissertation with an ethnography of Chicago industrial workers, later to become Manufacturing Consent: Changes in the Labor Process Under Monopoly Capitalism.

Burawoy joined the Department of Sociology, University of California, Berkeley in 1976 as an assistant professor. He served as Chair of the Department of Sociology for 1996–98 and 2000–02.

Aside from the sociological study of the industrial workplace in Zambia, Burawoy studied industrial workplaces in Chicago, Hungary, and post-Soviet Russia. His method of choice was usually participant observation, more specifically ethnography. He further expanded the extended case method. For his book The Radiant Past: Ideology and Reality in Hungary's Road to Capitalism (1992) he worked as a furnace operator in a Hungarian steel plant. Based on his studies of the workplace he looked into the nature of postcolonialism, the organization of state socialism, and the problems in the transition from socialism.

Burawoy moved away from observing factories to looking at his own place of work—the university—to consider the way sociology was taught to students and how it was put into the public domain. His work on public sociology is most prominently shown in his presidential address to the American Sociological Association in 2004, where he divided sociology into four separate (yet overlapping) categories: public sociology, policy sociology (which has an extra-academic audience), professional sociology (which addresses an academic audience familiar with theoretical and methodological frameworks common to the discipline of sociology), and lastly critical sociology which, like public sociology, produces reflexive knowledge but which is only available to an academic audience, like professional sociology.

As President of the International Sociological Association, he stated at the 2014 World Congress of Sociology, "Between economics and political science, sociology is not social science. It is rather scientific socialism... Our role as sociologists is to watch, engage and challenge an unequal world... So sociologists of the world, unite!"

In 2022, The University of Johannesburg awarded Burawoy an honorary doctoral degree "for making considerable theoretical and methodological contributions to the development of Sociology", citing the "profound impact" of his contributions. In his acceptance speech, Burawoy remarked that "South Africa opened my eyes to the mysteries of Apartheid and later to many worlds of oppression and struggle". Burawoy commented that he saw South African sociology as "way ahead of the rest" and "at the vanguard of what I call 'public sociology'".

In 2023, UC Berkeley's Sociology Department established an endowment to support students in honor of Michael Burawoy following a gift of $100,000 from alumna Suava Zbierski-Salameh (a former student of Burawoy). The Dean of Social Sciences, Raka Ray, remarked that "Burawoy's impact on sociology is monumental" adding that "his national and international presence alongside his tireless dedication to Berkeley, makes him a pillar of our community."

In 2024, Burawoy received the W. E. B. Du Bois Career of Distinguished Scholarship Award from the American Sociological Association (ASA). The citation read that "Burawoy's work has contributed enormously to our ability to grasp the social world", and described his advocacy for public sociology as "a critical intervention in the field". The citation further highlighted his "seemingly infinite devotion and intellectual energy".

Burawoy advocated for Palestinian solidarity in the ASA, writing and organizing in support of an ASA "Resolution for Justice in Palestine".

Burawoy was killed in a crosswalk in Oakland, on 3 February 2025, by a speeding driver who fled the scene. He was 77. His ashes were interred in Highgate Cemetery on 8 April 2025.

== Legacy ==
Following his death, the European Sociological Association wrote that "Sociological communities across the world have lost one of the giants of our discipline" and described Burawoy as "a sociologist of immense integrity, passion, kindness, and intellectual rigor". The British Sociological Association described Burawoy as "a truly remarkable scholar" and noted that his "brilliant scholarship reshaped our understanding of industrial labour and its broader social impact". The Sociological Review Foundation, in a statement by Professor Michaela Benson, described Burawoy as "a scholar who inspired generations of colleagues from around the world through his scholarship, public engagement and warmth". The Economic Sociology and Political Economy global academic community, in a eulogy by Oleg Komlik, referred to Burawoy as "preeminent, inspiring, and brilliant sociologist, and above all, an extraordinary and gentle human being... Professor Burawoy profoundly influenced [...] sociologists and activists around the world. He did it through his immense intellectual power, groundbreaking research [...], resolute commitment to dialogue across disciplines and borders, moral spirit, exceptional communication and organizational talents, and remarkable personal generosity."

A memorial piece in Diario Feminista by International Sociological Association vice president Marta Soler Gallart recalled Burawoy offering support to survivors of sexual harassment in academia, and his support for a centre that supported victims of harassment in Spanish universities. Soler Gallart wrote that "until the last moment Michael continued supporting victims and survivors".

== Selected works ==
=== Books ===
==== Author (or co-author) ====
- The Colour of Class on the Copper Mines: From African Advancement to Zambianization. Manchester: Manchester University Press, 1972
- Manufacturing Consent: Changes in the Labor Process Under Monopoly Capitalism. Chicago: University of Chicago Press, 1979
- The Politics of Production: Factory Regimes Under Capitalism and Socialism. London: Verso, 1985
- The Radiant Past: Ideology and Reality in Hungary's Road to Capitalism. Chicago: University of Chicago Press, 1992 (With János Lukács)
- The Extended Case Method: Four Countries, Four Decades, Four Great Transformations, and One Theoretical Tradition (University of California Press), 2009
- Symbolic Violence: Conversations with Bourdieu (Duke University Press), 2019
- Public Sociology (Polity Press), 2021

==== Collaborative and edited books ====
- Marxist Inquiries: Studies of Labor, Class and States. Chicago: University of Chicago Press. Supplement to the American Journal of Sociology. Edited with Theda Skocpol, 1983
- Ethnography Unbound: Power and Resistance in the Modern Metropolis. Berkeley: University of California Press, 1991 (With ten coauthors)
- Uncertain Transition: Ethnographies of Change in the PostSocialist World. Lanham, MD: Rowman and Littlefield. Edited with Katherine Verdery, 1998
- От Деревянного Парижа к Панельной Орбите: Модель жилищных классов Сыктывкара. (From Timbered Paris to Concrete Orbita: The Structure of Housing Classes in Syktyvkar). Syktyvkar: Institute of Regional Social Research of Komi, 1999 (With Pavel Krotov and Tatyana Lytkina)
- Global Ethnography: Forces, Connections and Imaginations in a Postmodern World. Berkeley: University of California Press, 2000 (With nine coauthors)
- Engaging Erik Olin Wright: Between Class Analysis and Real Utopias. London: Verso. Edited with Gay W. Seidman, 2024

=== Articles ===
- "Dwelling in Capitalism, Traveling Through Socialism", pp. 21–44 in Baldoz et al. (editors), The Critical Study of Work (Philadelphia: Temple University Press.)
- Burawoy, Michael (January 2001). "Neoclassical Sociology: From the End of Communism to the End of Classes". American Journal of Sociology. 106 (4): 1099–1120. doi:10.1086/320299. S2CID 46330419. Pdf.
- "What Happened to the Working Class?" pp. 69–76 in Kevin Leicht (ed.), The Future of the Market transition (New York: JAI Press), 2002
- "Sociological Marxism", pp. 459–86 in Jonathan Turner (ed.), The Handbook of Sociological Theory, 2002 (Plenum Books) (With Erik Wright)
- Burawoy, Michael (June 2003). "For a Sociological Marxism: The Complementary Convergence of Antonio Gramsci and Karl Polanyi". Politics and Society. 31 (2): 193–261. doi:10.1177/0032329203252270. S2CID 146438026. Pdf.
- Burawoy, Michael (October 2003). "Revisits: An Outline of a Theory of Reflexive Ethnography". American Sociological Review. 68 (5): 645–679. doi:10.2307/1519757. JSTOR 1519757. S2CID 147578652. Pdf.
- Burawoy, Michael (2004). "Public Sociology: South African Dilemmas in a Global Context". Society in Transition. 35 (1): 11–26. doi:10.1080/21528586.2004.10419104. S2CID 162269948. Pdf.
- "The Critical Turn to Public Sociology", pp. 309–322 in Rhonda Levine (ed.), Enriching the Sociological Imagination: How Radical Sociology Changed the Discipline, New York, 2004
- "The World Needs Public Sociology". Norwegian Journal of Sociology (Sosiologisk Tidsskrift). 12 (3): 255–272. 2004. English pdf.
- "Antinomian Marxist", pp. 48–71 in Alan Sica and Stephen Turner (eds.), The Disobedient Generation: Social Theorists in the Sixties (Chicago: University of Chicago Press), 2005
- Burawoy, Michael (February 2005). "For Public Sociology". American Sociological Review. 70 (1): 4–28. doi:10.1177/000312240507000102. JSTOR 4145348. S2CID 53656925. Pdf.
- "Provincializing the Social Sciences", pp. 508–525 in George Steinmetz (editor), The Politics of Method in the Human Sciences: Positivism and its Epistemological Others (Durhman, NC: Duke University Press), 2005
- Burawoy, Michael (July 2005). "The Return of the Repressed: Recovering the Public Face of U.S. Sociology, 100 Years on". The Annals of the American Academy of Political and Social Science. 600: 68–87. doi:10.1177/0002716205277028. JSTOR 25046111. S2CID 145089778. Pdf.
- "Public sociology vs. the market (within "Economic sociology as public sociology" - discussion forum)". Socio-Economic Review. 5 (2): 356–367. April 2007. doi:10.1093/ser/mwl031. Burawoy's website. Pdf.
- "Private Troubles and Public Issues", pp. 125–133 in Andrew Barlow (editor), Collaborations for Social Justice (Lanham, MD: Rowman and Littlefield), 2007
- Burawoy, Michael (May 2008). "A Public Sociology for California". Critical Sociology. 34 (3): 339–348. doi:10.1177/0896920507088162. S2CID 145277406. Pdf.

Professional and academic associations
Preceded by William T. Bielby	President of the American Sociological Association; 2004	Succeeded by Troy Duster
Preceded by Michel Wieviorka	President of the International Sociological Association; 2010–2014	Succeeded by Margaret Abraham
