= Global value chain =

Economic activities to bring a product to market

A global value chain (GVC) refers to the full range of activities that economic actors engage in to bring a product to market. It plays a critical role in the modern economy, bridging thousands of different markets, technologies, and ideas. The global value chain does not only involve production processes, but preproduction (such as design) and postproduction processes (such as marketing and distribution).

GVC is similar to industry-level value chain but encompasses operations at the global level. GVC is similar to the concept of a supply chain, but the latter focuses on conveyance of materials and products between locations, often including change of ownership of those materials and products. The existence of a global value chain (i.e. where different stages in the production and consumption of materials and products of value take place in different parts of the world) implies a global supply chain engaged in the movement of those materials and products on a global basis. By outsourcing to various economic actors, firms can efficiently and effectively design, manufacture, and distribute products globally. However, these benefits come at a cost, with distinct winners and losers within the GVC.

As states become increasingly vulnerable to economic interdependence, fewer are relying on global value chains and instead are pushing for protectionist policies. This has led to uncertainty over the future of global value chains and whether it will become less critical to the international political economy.

== In development ==
The first references to the concept of a global value chain date from the mid-1990s. Early references were enthusiastic about the upgrading prospects for developing countries that joined them. In his early work based on research on East Asian garment firms, Gary Gereffi, the pioneer in value chain analysis, describes a process of almost 'natural' learning and upgrading for the firms which participated in GVCs. This echoed the 'export-led' discourse of the World Bank in the 'East Asian Miracle' report based on the East Asian 'Tigers' success. In economics, GVC was first formalized in a paper by Hummels, Ishii and Yi in 2001. They defined GVC as the foreign component of imported intermediate inputs used to produce output, and some fraction of output is subsequently exported. Allowing for such a framework, Kei-Mu Yi showed in a 2003 paper that the growth of world trade can be explained with moderate changes in the trade costs and named this phenomenon "vertical specialization".

This encouraged the World Bank and other leading institutions to encourage developing firms to develop their indigenous capabilities through a process of upgrading technical capabilities to meet global standards with leading multinational enterprises (MNE) playing a key role in helping local firms through transfer of new technology, skills and knowledge.

Wider adoption of open source hardware technology used for digital fabrication such as 3D printers like the RepRap has the potential to partially reverse the trend towards global specialization of production systems into elements that may be geographically dispersed and closer to the end users (localization) and thus disrupt global value chains.

=== Analytical framework ===
Global value chains are a network of production and trade across countries. The study of global value chains requires inevitably a trade theory that can treat input trade. However, mainstream trade theories (Heckscher-Ohlin-Samuelson model and New trade theory and New new trade theory) are only concerned with final goods. It needs a New new new trade theory. Escaith and Miroudot estimates that the Ricardian trade model in its extended form has "the advantage" of being better suited to the analysis of global value chains. Shiozawa argued that global value chains can be treated by the new theory of international values, because it is a general theory of input trade with many-country, many-product economy. He contends that global value chains are a new transforming general purpose technology.

The lack of appropriate tool of analysis, the studies of GVCs were initially conducted mainly by sociologists like Gary Gereffi, and management science researchers. See for a genealogy Jennifer Bair (2009). This is changing, with more studies by means of global Input-Output Table starting by economists, and economic geographers outlining the case for proactive sub-national public policy on the engagement of GVCs.

=== Development and upgrading ===
GVCs become a major topic in development economics especially for middle-income countries, because the "upgrading" within GVCs became the crucial condition for the sustained growth of those countries.

GVC analysis views "upgrading" as a continuum starting with "process upgrading" (e.g. a producer adopts better technology to improve efficiency), then moves on to "product upgrading" where the quality or functionality of the product is upgraded by using higher quality material or a better quality management system (QMS), and then on to "functional upgrading" in which the firm begins to design its own product and develops marketing and branding capabilities and begins to supply to end markets/customers directly – often by targeting geographies or customers (which are not served by its existing multinational clients). Subsequently, the process of upgrading might also cover inter-sectoral upgrading.

Functional upgrading to high-value-added activities like design and branding is for developing country suppliers a key opportunity to achieve higher profits in GVC. Likewise, a 2017 review of the empirical literature highlighted that suppliers operating in unstable economies, like Pakistan and Bangladesh, face high barriers to reach functional upgrading in high-value-added activities. In general, lower-income countries typically have fewer specialized and skilled labor and less capital to invest in the technology and infrastructure necessary for functional upgrading.

This upgrading process in GVCs has been challenged by other researchers – some of whom argue that insertion in global value chains does not always lead to upgrading due to the asymmetrical relationship between buyers and suppliers. Lead firms have structural power relative to supplier firms, meaning they can control the involvement of other firms with the supply chain. For example, firms can (and do) choose to maintain control over higher-valued activities, such as design, marketing, and branding, and have no interest in transferring these core skills to their suppliers. Thus, smaller firms in developing countries are forced to focus on lower-valued activities, like manufacturing, reducing their ability to upgrade and access global markets (except as a supplier).

Other authors point to the benefits of considering upgrading at a regional, or sub-national level. This focus enhances the possibility that less-developed regions capture the gains from GVC insertion.

=== Digital B2B platforms in global supply chains ===
Digital B2B platforms are used as part of the infrastructure supporting the global supply chain by facilitating interactions between suppliers, manufacturers, and buyers across national boundaries. These platforms allow firms to find suppliers, share product details, and organize transactions without having to be physically present in international markets. They have been particularly relevant for small and medium-sized enterprises (SMEs), which tend to be hampered by limited capital, regulatory complexity, and the lack of access to global distribution channels.

Within the broader context of global supply chains, digital B2B platforms are generally used in addition to existing procurement, logistics, and distribution systems rather than as replacements for them. The conventional aspects of the supply chain, such as manufacturing plants, transport systems, and warehousing, are indispensable, but digital platforms primarily support coordination and the flow of information. These platforms can help reduce information asymmetry between supply chain participants in varying regions through standardized listings, communication tools, and data-sharing mechanisms.

The integration of digital B2B platforms into global supply chains has also been discussed in relation to supply chain visibility and operational coordination. Digital tools have been shown to facilitate decision-making, supplier comparison, and transaction efficiency across geographically distributed networks, as international trade and adoption of technology continue to expand. This reflects a broader trend whereby businesses aim at enhancing responsiveness and flexibility in the complicated global supply chain environments. Several global B2B platforms operate in this space. Alibaba is cited in third-party reporting as one example of an online marketplace used to connect manufacturers and buyers in international markets. In this role, such platforms function as intermediaries that facilitate information exchange and commercial coordination while remaining embedded within conventional structures of international trade. Their use highlights the growing role of digital infrastructure in supporting, rather than redefining, established global supply chain systems.

=== Current research on governance and its impact from a development perspective ===
There are motivations behind renewed interest in global value chains and the opportunities that they may present for countries in South Asia. A 2013 report found that looking at the production chain, rather than the individual stages of production, is more helpful. Individual donors with their own priorities and expertise cannot be expected to provide comprehensive response to the needs identified, not to mention the legal responsibilities of many specialist agencies. The research suggests they adjust their priorities and modalities to the way production chains operate, and to coordinate with other donors to cover all trade needs. It calls for donors and governments to work together to assess how aid flows may affect power relationships.

In his 1994 paper, Gereffi identified two major types of governance. The first were buyer-driven supply chains, where the lead firms are final buyers such as retail chains and branded product producers such as non-durable final consumer products (e.g., clothing, footwear and food). Rather than produce the product themselves, these firms rely on a tier of suppliers to manufacture the finished goods. Most suppliers reside in developing countries and seek to change their position in the global supply chain, moving from a lower-tier supplier to a higher-tier one. These desires create heightened competition among developing countries, which final buyers leverage by demanding goods at certain prices and qualities. Suppliers are pressured to comply with these rules out of fear that another supplier will replace them if they fail to do so. The second governance type identified by Gereffi were producer-driven supply chains, typically led by advanced manufacturers, with control over raw materials and distribution. Here the technological competences of the lead firms (generally upstream in the chain) defined the chain's competitiveness.

Current research suggests that GVCs exhibit a variety of characteristics and impact communities in a variety of ways. In a paper that emerged from the deliberations of the GVC Initiative, five GVC governance patterns were identified:

- Hierarchical chains represent the fully internalized operations of vertically integrated firms.
- Quasi-hierarchical (or captive chains) involve suppliers or intermediate customers with low levels of capabilities, who require high levels of support and are the subject of well-developed supply chain management from lead firms (often called the chain governor).
- Relational and modular chain governance exhibit durable relations between lead firms and their suppliers and customers in the chain, but with low levels of chain governance often because the main suppliers in the chain possess their own unique competences (and/or infrastructure) and can operate independently of the lead firm.
- Market chains represent the classic arms length relationships found in many commodity markets.

As capabilities in many low- and middle-income economies have grown, chain governance has tended to move away from quasi-hierarchical models toward modular type as this form of governance reduces the costs of supply chain management and allows chain governors to maintain a healthy level of competition in their supply chains. However, whilst it maintains short-term competition in the supply chain, it has allowed some leading intermediaries to develop considerable functional competences (e.g., design and branding). In the long term these have the potential to emerge as competitors to their original chain governor. Other study outlines the initiative to promote inclusive GVC, three GVC patterns were identified:

The theoretical concepts often considered firms as operating in a single value chain (with a single customer). Whilst this was often the case in quasi-hierarchical chains (with considerable customer power) it has become apparent that some firms operate in multiple value chains (subject to multiple forms of governance) and serve both national and international markets and that this plays a role in the development of firm capabilities. The recent trend in GVC research shows exploration of issue emerging from the interaction of different stakeholders from within and outside the GVC structures and their effects on the sustainability of the GVCs. For examples, the local governance institutions and production firms.

=== Summary of Unctad report ===
In 2013, UNCTAD published two reports on GVCs and their contribution to development. They concluded that:

- GVCs make a significant contribution to international development. Value-added trade contributes about 30% to the GDP of developing countries, significantly more than it does in developed countries (18%) furthermore the level of participation in GVCs is associated with stronger levels of GDP per capita growth. GVCs thus have a direct impact on the economy, employment and income and create opportunities for development. They can also be an important mechanism for developing countries enhance productive capacity, by increasing the rate of adoption of technology and through workforce skill development, thus building the foundations for long-term industrial upgrading.
- However, there are limitations to the GVC approach. Their contribution to the growth may be limited if the work done in-country is relatively low value adding (i.e. contributes only a small part of the total value added for the product or service). In addition there is no automatic process that guarantees diffusion of technology, skill-building and upgrading. Developing countries thus face the risk of operating in permanently low value-added activities. Finally, there are potential negative impacts on the environment and social conditions, including: poor workplace conditions, occupational safety and health, and job security. The relative ease with which the Value Chain Governors can relocate their production (often to lower cost countries) also create additional risks.
- Countries need to carefully assess the pros and cons of GVC participation and the costs and benefits of proactive policies to promote GVCs or GVC-led development strategies. Promoting GVC participation implies targeting specific GVC segments and GVC participation can only form one part of a country's overall development strategy.
- Before promoting GVC participation, policymakers should evaluate their countries' trade profiles and industrial capabilities in order to select strategic GVC development paths. Achieving upgrading opportunities through CVCs requires a structured approach that includes:
  - embedding GVCs in industrial development policies (e.g. targeting GVC tasks and activities);
  - enabling GVC growth by providing the right framework conditions for trade and FDI and by putting in place the needed infrastructure; and
  - developing firm capabilities and training the local workforce.

== Gender ==
Gender plays a prominent role in global value chains, because it influences consumption patterns within the United States, and thus affects production on a larger scale. In turn, specific roles within the value chain are also determined by gender, making gender a key component in the process as well. The increase in global sourcing of production has created more and more work in the informal sector as labor intensive assembly work is being put out to homeworkers in the informal sector where women work as self employed traders and producers, casual workers, or sub contract workers. Far more women than men are found in the informal sector, as self-employed workers or subcontractors, while specific jobs and broader fields of work differ between men and women. In more than 90 percent of Sub-Saharan African countries, 89 percent of Southern Asian countries, and 75 percent of Latin American countries, women are more exposed to informal work.

Education levels, legal barriers, and social norms, are all factors that contribute to women being largely concentrated in informal work across global value chains. Work in the informal sector is primarily held by low-skill workers with little to no education. Because labor in the informal sector requires low levels of skill, individuals who are looking for work but lack a strong education frequently find work in the informal sector. Women tend to receive less education than men, in sub-Saharan Africa, women only receive 70 percent of the schooling that men do. Women's concentration in the informal sector is also influenced by social norms. In Senegal, women spend six times as much time as men caring for their families and completing household chores. The time spend in unpaid care labor puts constraints on women's ability to find formal work within a global value chain. Women seeking jobs in the formal sector face extra challenges due to legal barriers. Many Sub-Saharan African countries, for example, prohibit women from signing work contracts or opening bank accounts without their husband's permission.

Within global value chains, the distribution of returns between firms in the formal sector and women in the informal sector is disproportionate. In Zimbabwe's non-traditional agricultural exports value chains (NTAE), women accounted for only 12% of total costs while exporters accounted for 30% importers for 12% and retailers for 46% of costs.

== Sustainability ==
Sustainability is an increasingly important factor in global value chains, and there is a growing need to evaluate their performance based on social and environmental impact, as well as economic. Initiatives such as The United Nations Sustainable Development Goals encourage sustainable practices through its 17-goal blueprint, but there are few enforced policies which address sustainability with the urgency required to protect natural resources and reduce the impacts of climate change on a global scale.

Sustainability efforts in global value chains are often voluntary steps taken in the private sector, such as the use of sustainability standards and certifications, and ecolabels, but they can sometimes lack evidence of measurable sustainable impacts. For example, some ecolabels seek to address issues such as poverty. Yet in some cases, even if producers meet ecolabel standards, the burden of certification costs can end up reducing the overall income for these producers.

The measurement of sustainability in global value chains requires a multifaceted assessment which includes environmental, social and economic impacts, and it must also be standardized enough to be compared in order to generate sufficient learning and for scalability. Technologies that make these types of measurements are becoming both more available and essential for the public and private sector sustainability efforts. Besides, the recent finding shows that the local realities like governance system and institutions also play a significant role in economic sustainability of the global value chains. Implementation of sustainability policies at the global level demands the greening of supply chains in their entirety, as well as their comprehensive technological modernization to accommodate advancing trends such as digitization, artificial intelligence (AI), and big data.

== Negative impacts ==
Global supply chain management is facing the increasing difficulty in predicting demand variability in different areas. In addition, managing the production and transportation of goods over large distances to meet the peak demand represents another challenge.

Integrating global value chains requires all actors to adapt to technological changes, which is capital-intensive. Therefore, it is safe to say that this trend significantly benefits developed countries rather than developing countries. Participation in the global value chain can also create disproportionate environmental impacts for developing countries. Firms from higher-income countries often leverage their structural power to shift environmental impacts to lower-income countries with fewer environmental regulations. Firms turn these developing countries into their "pollution haven", employing energy-intensive production methods. Lower-income countries are also pressured to enter the global value chain and rapidly industrialize. They often lack the green technology to combat their high energy consumption, accounting for nearly 80 percent of global consumption in 2024.

The global value chain also presents national security and geopolitical risks for countries that are economically interdependent. They become vulnerable or sensitive to their trade partners' policies and decisions, which may result in the unavailability of critical goods due to another country's political or economic state. These risks were realized during the COVID-19 pandemic when supply chains temporarily paused, disrupting the exchange of raw materials and finished products.

Shifting of production base by the lead firm raises the challenges of sustainability for the local firms (economy) and the labor (society).

== Future ==
In recent years, the growth of global value chains has slowed, with an increasing number of firms reshoring or nearshoring. Part of these decisions to move to domestic production stems from concerns over economic interdependence and vulnerability after COVID-19. However, interest in protectionist policies began years before the pandemic. Countries began pushing for populist policies after the 2008 financial crisis left thousands of industries vulnerable. More recently, global conflicts have disrupted global supply chains, further motivating countries to decrease their reliance on outsourcing production. Growing tensions between Ukraine and Russia have directly affected food-importing countries, such as Egypt, Tunisia, and Armenia, which heavily rely on grains from Ukraine, one of the leading exporters of wheat and barley. The war has also had rippling effects on the textile, food processing, and livestock industries, leading to economic losses globally. The United States has been a prominent actor in the push for protectionist policies, enacting an "America First" framework characterized by high tariffs and a reduction in imports. However, the U.S. removed many of the tariffs on food products after feeling the effects of de-globalization, with double-digit increases in many everyday foods, like bananas, coffee, and orange juice. It is unlikely that global value chains will cease to exist due to the great need to access critical resources from different parts of the world, although reliance on these chains may significantly decrease as states consider their vulnerability to regional and global instability.

== Data and software ==
OECD maintains Inter-Country Input-Output (ICIO) tables; the most recent update was November 2021. An earlier project started at the University of Groningen. GTAP maintains a software program with an included trade database. Open-source software in R includes the decompr and gvc packages.

== See also ==
- Agricultural value chain
- Global commodity chain
- World Values Survey
