= Raka Ray =

Indian-American sociologist

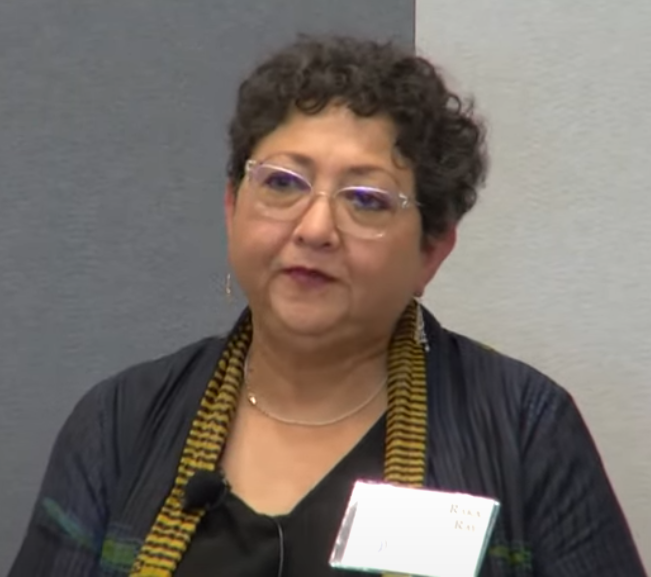
- At UC Berkeley's 2024 Charter Hill Leadership Roundtable
- Born: 28 July 1962 (age 64); Calcutta, India
- Education: University of Wisconsin-Madison (Ph.D) University of Wisconsin-Madison (M.S) Bryn Mawr College (B.A.)
- Occupations: Professor: Departments of Sociology and Southeast Asian Studies, University of California, Berkeley
- Website: sociology.berkeley.edu/alumni-manager/raka-ray

Raka Ray (born 28 July 1962) is an American sociologist and academic. She is a full-time professor at the University of California, Berkeley (UC-Berkeley) in the departments of Sociology and Southeast Asian Studies. She became the Dean of Social Sciences at UC-Berkeley in January 2020. Ray's research interests include gender and feminist theory, postcolonial sociology, emerging middle classes, South Asia, inequality, qualitative research methods, and social movements. Her current project explores changes in the meanings and relations of servitude in India. Ray is also an editor of the publication Feminist Studies.

== Early life and education ==
Ray was originally a History major and later decided to specialize in sociology due to her interest in issues of unequal power and her desire to solve social inequalities. For her Bachelor of Arts degree, she studied sociology at Bryn Mawr College in 1985. She then proceeded to earn an M.S. and PhD in 1987 and 1993, respectively, at the University of Wisconsin-Madison.

== Career ==
Ray believes in her greater utility as an academic, rather than an activist, in investigating systematic inequalities. When discussing obstacles in her education and career, as a woman of color, Ray highlights that this was not something she experienced (in India) until she moved to the United States. Ray explains that her focus on gender in South Asia was "consistently seen as marginal to mainstream Sociology" and that she had to battle with "constant particularizing" of her work and the "universalizing of work on the US".

As well as teaching at the University of Berkeley, Ray has also given several conferences, organized panels, published articles and books. In 2018, she co-published The Social Life of Gender with Jennifer Carlson and Abigail Andrews. Ray notably focuses on postcolonial sociology and its relation to modern feminist discourse. She has highlighted the lack of critique of postcolonial theory, due to "sociology's attachment to its own modernist foundations and to universalism". Ray argues that the "founding fathers of sociology" (Marx, Weber, Durkheim) have overlooked the importance of colonialism in the making of European modernity. This focus on a self-sufficient Europe has transcended into American sociology too—what Julian Go refers to as metrocentrism. Ray notes the parallel between defining Europe and America as the norm and the rest as the difference, similar to how men are treated as the norm and women, the difference.

Assessing the effects of colonialism on women, Ray states that " [British, French, Dutch and German] colonialism fundamentally (though not uniformly) transformed gender in the countries they colonized". In the colonies, women's economic and social rights have been denied and at times suppressed—through the suppression of land property rights, the introduction of the male figure as the breadwinner and the introduction of family laws. Colonialism, according to Ray, has created large gaps in society and has opened the door to nationalism. This struggle between north–south impacts the idea of "global sisterhood" and creates social and economic divides between former colonies and former colonizers.

Ray believes that in order to understand the modern world and the feminist discourse associated with it, it is crucial to look at other regions of the world, especially those that have been affected the most by colonialism. "Those who live in England and think they understand British culture/history/politics or even sports without knowing about colonialism are simply wrong, for today's England is as much created by British colonialism as was India or South America," she noted. She continues, "colonialist representations shape contemporary understandings in Europe and North America about gender relations in postcolonial countries". Ray asserts that these images misrepresent the women and men of postcolonial countries because they are rooted in a fundamental misunderstanding of gender in these parts of the world. She identifies this misunderstanding as a source of tension between women's movements around the world; "White feminists from Europe and North America still imagine women in other countries to be poor, uneducated, and oppressed, while envisioning themselves as liberated, educated, and middle class. They continue to echo colonial relations by positioning white Europeans and North American women as saviors and third world women as victims in need of rescue, as did the colonial civilizing mission". Ray believes that Western feminist discourse would be enhanced by studying and incorporating a more global perspective.

== Influence ==
Ray's decision to enter academia was influenced by her mother, who was a historian and university professor. She reiterates that while he had a privileged childhood in India, she was aware of the inequalities "of class, and especially gender" around her. Both her personal life and later professional specializations have been influenced by political events such as "violence, social movements that inspire, the rise of the Right". Ray has cited Marxist and Feminist theories as crucial to her intellectual formation. Specifically, these perspectives offered her a platform to explore postcolonialism in greater detail.

Ray cites many people as having inspired and influenced her work. "Intellectual work is never solo, it builds on the shoulders of so many who have gone before". More specifically, she cites Karl Marx, Antonio Gramsci, Pierre Bourdieu, and Nancy Fraser as having had a profound influence on her work, as well has her teachers, students, colleagues such as Michael Burawoy and the late Saba Mahmood. Additionally, the people she has interviewed through her many projects have also inspired her.

== Research ==
Ray's initial area of academic focus was the region of South Asia, where she was raised. The region remains relevant to her work due to its strong feminist movement as well as the continuing legacy of colonialism, whose effects can still be seen in everything from laws to the backlash against feminist movements.

Ray also works on topics of intersectionality. She has noted that "gender relations are constituted jointly with other relations of power, difference and inequality such as nationality, sexuality, class, "Race" and religion", proving that women around the world do not necessarily share homogeneous experiences of gender inequality, or even gender itself.

She is currently working on a project that seeks to explore the concept of masculinity. Ray argues that, while ample intersectionality scholarship is devoted to exploring the concept of "femininity", the same task has not been adequately performed regarding "masculinity". More specifically, she is researching the tendency of current models to infuse the concept of masculinity with power, embedded in men's roles as workers, producers, and heads of household as well as how this compares to the realities of most men. According to Ray, as household structures have shifted and the premise of the family wage has declined in Post-Fordist economies, male class and gender identities are seen and felt to be increasingly precarious.

Globally, Ray sees a similar gap in gender-related studies of development. Over the last two decades, "women" have emerged as the ideal subjects of development, with NGOs overwhelmingly preferring to invest in women rather than men. Seen as both responsible and aspirational, micro-finance models of development have inevitably focused on female entrepreneurs. Women from the Global South who visibly stand up for themselves are increasingly being highlighted as role models. This has often occurred, however, at the expense of young men, especially those who lack class advantage. Seen as "left behind" by the world economy", Ray argues that such men are often portrayed to be a threat to wider society. In most of the instances where they are targeted by NGOs, it is to prevent them from becoming involved in extremism rather than seeking to elevate their quality of life.

Along with her former graduate students, Ray authored a textbook entitled The Social Life of Gender, which is the first textbook to introduce postcolonial theory into the sociology of gender while offering an entirely new method to teach gender.

== Critical reception ==
=== Academic awards and honors ===
- 2003–2012: Sarah Kailath Chair of India Studies
- 2010: Department of Sociology Graduation Keynote speaker, May.
- 2010: (with Sanchita Saxena) Department of Education Title VI Grant for South Asia National Resource Center at the University of California, Berkeley, for 2010–14; and Foreign Language and Area Studies Fellowships Grant, for 2010–14.
- 2013: UC-Berkeley Graduate Division Graduate Mentoring Award

== Select publications ==
=== Books ===
- Ray, Raka, Jennifer Carlson and Abigail Andrews (eds). 2018. The Social Life of Gender: Sage.
- Orloff, Ann, Raka Ray and Evren Savci (eds). 2016. "Perverse Politics? Feminism, anti-imperialism, Multiplicity", Special Issue, Political Power and Social Theory 30
- Ray, Raka. 2012. (ed.) Handbook on Gender. Delhi: Oxford University Press (3rd reprint 2014).
- Baviskar, Amita and Raka Ray 2011. (eds.) Both Elite and Everyman: The Cultural Politics of the Indian Middle Classes. Routledge (2nd reprint 2015)
- Ray, Raka and Seemin Qayum. 2009. Cultures of Servitude: Modernity, Domesticity and Class in India. Palo Alto: Stanford University Press (in India, Oxford University Press, 2010)
- Ray, Raka. 1999. Fields of Protest: Women's Movements in India. Minneapolis: University of Minnesota Press.

=== Articles ===
- Ray, Raka and Srila Roy (forthcoming). Feminism and the Politics of Gender in India at 70, Pluto Press
- Ray, Raka (forthcoming). "The Idea of the Middle Class versus the Middle Classes". Contributions to Indian Sociology: New Directions in Indian Sociology.
- Ray, Raka (2018). "Postcoloniality and the Sociology of Gender". Raewyn Connell, Pat Martin, James Messerschmidt and Michael Messner (eds). Gender Reckonings: New Social Theory and Research. New York University Press
- Ray, Raka and Smitha Radhakrishnan. 2010. "The Subaltern, the Postcolonial, and Cultural Sociology", in John Hall, Laura Grindstaff, and Ming-Cheng Lo (eds), Handbook of Cultural Sociology (Routledge, 2010)

=== Book reviews and shorter pieces ===
- "The Logic of Trans and the Logic of Place" Review of Rogers Brubaker, Trans. European Journal of Sociology, 58, 3 (2017), pp. 476–479
- 2017, "Trumpism and the White Male Working Class", Global Dialogue (7:4)
- 2017, A Case of Internal Colonialism? Arlie Hochschild's Strangers in their Own Land. British Journal of Sociology
- Nivedita Menon, Seeing Like a Feminist. Indian Express, June 8, 2013
- "The Everyday Embrace of Inequality", The Hindu, February 2, 2012.
- Ritty Lukose, Liberalization's Children: Gender, Youth, and Consumer Citizenship in Globalizing India. Contemporary Sociology 40(1). 2011.
