= Manufacturing Consent (Burawoy book) =

1979 book on monopoly capitalism

- Title page for Manufacturing Consent (1979)
- Author: Michael Burawoy
- Publisher: University of Chicago Press
- Publication date: 1979

Manufacturing Consent: Changes in the Labor Process Under Monopoly Capitalism is a scholarly book written by the British Marxist sociologist Michael Burawoy. It was published in 1979 by the University of Chicago Press.

== See also ==
- Monopoly capitalism
