= Journal of Education Policy =

- Subject: Education policy
- Language: English
- Edited by: Stephen Ball, Ivor Goodson, Carol Vincent, Andrew W. Wilkins, Antonio Olmedo

Publication details
- History: 1986-present
- Publisher: Taylor & Francis
- Frequency: Bimonthly
- Impact factor: 2.313 (2016)

Standard abbreviations
- ISO 4: J. Educ. Policy

Indexing
- ISSN: 0268-0939
- LCCN: 86641438
- OCLC no.: 633652748

Links
- Journal homepage; Online access; Online archive

The Journal of Education Policy is a bimonthly peer-reviewed academic journal covering education policy. It was established in 1986 and is published by Taylor & Francis. Previous editors-in-chief include founding editor Ivor Goodson (University of Brighton), Stephen Ball (UCL Institute of Education) and Carol Vincent (UCL Institute of Education). Current editors-in-chief are Andrew W. Wilkins (Goldsmiths University of London) and Antonio Olmedo (University of Exeter). According to the Journal Citation Reports, the journal has a 2016 impact factor of 2.313, ranking it 24th out of 235 journals in the category "Education & Educational Research".
