= Rachel Sherman (sociologist) =

American sociologist

Rachel Ellen Sherman
- Born: June 7, 1970 (age 56)

Academic background
- Education: PhD
- Alma mater: University of California, Berkeley
- Doctoral advisor: Michael Burawoy
- Other advisor: Kim Voss

Academic work
- Institutions: New School for Social Research

Rachel Sherman (born June 7, 1970) is a professor of sociology at the New School for Social Research. Her first book, Class Acts: Service and Inequality in Luxury Hotels (University of California Press, 2007), analyzes how workers, guests, and managers in luxury hotels make sense of and negotiate class inequalities that mark their relationships. Her second book, Uneasy Street: The Anxieties of Affluence (Princeton University Press, 2017), explores the lived experience of privilege among wealthy parents in New York City.

== Education and career ==
Sherman obtained her bachelor's degree in Development Studies from Brown University. She received a master's degree and Ph.D. in sociology from the University of California, Berkeley. Prior to joining the New School for Social Research, she was an assistant professor in the Sociology Department of Yale University.

== Research ==
Sherman studies "how and why unequal social relations are reproduced, legitimated, and contested, and in how these processes are embedded in cultural vocabularies of identity, interaction, and entitlement. Her research interests include: social class, culture, service work, social movements, and qualitative methods.

Her first book Class Acts: Service and Inequality in Luxury Hotels, which grew out of her Ph.D. dissertation, analyzes the production and consumption of luxury service work. Drawing on participant observation, Sherman "goes behind the scenes in two urban luxury hotels to give a nuanced picture of the workers who care for and cater to wealthy guests by providing seemingly unlimited personal attention." She finds that the interactions between service workers and wealthy guests normalize their class inequality.

In Uneasy Street: the Anxieties of Affluence, Sherman shifts her perspective to well-to-do parents in New York City. Over the course of fifty interviews, "including hedge fund financiers and corporate lawyers, professors and artists, and stay-at-home mothers," she investigates aspirations and lifestyle choices, revealing the self-image of the affluent in an increasingly unequal society.

In addition to her scholarship, Sherman teaches at the New School for Social Research and Eugene Lang College.

=== Memberships and awards ===
Sherman is a member of the American Sociological Association (ASA). She serves on the editorial board of the Oxford University Press book series on Global Ethnography, a program which publishes research monographs and books aimed at sociologists, social scientists and policy-makers on sociological questions or social policy issues. She is also the editor of the newsletter of the ASA Section on Labor and Labor Movements.

Sherman's article, "Breaking the Iron Law of Oligarchy: Tactical Innovation and the Revitalization of the American Labor Movement" (co-authored with Kim Voss), won the Distinguished Article Award of the Labor Studies Division of the Society for the Study of Social Problems in 2001.

Sherman is a reviewer for a number of professional and scholarly journals, including the American Journal of Sociology, Ethnography, Labor Studies Journal, Social Problems and Theory and Society.

== Published works ==
=== Books ===
- Uneasy Street: The Anxieties of Affluence. Princeton, NJ: Princeton University Press, 2017 ISBN 0-691-16550-5
- Class Acts: Service and Inequality in Luxury Hotels. Berkeley, Calif.: University of California Press, 2007. ISBN 0-520-24781-7

=== Recent articles and book chapters ===
- "Conflicted Cultivation: Parenting, Privilege, and Moral Worth in Wealthy New York Families." American Journal of Cultural Sociology 5(1–2): 1-33.
- "Caring or Catering? Emotions, Autonomy and Subordination in Lifestyle Work." In Caring on the Clock: The Complexities and Contradictions of Paid Care Work, edited by Mignon Duffy, Amy Armenia, and Clare Stacey, Rutgers University Press.
- "The Art of Conversation: The Museum and the Public Sphere in Tino Sehgal's This Progress." Public Culture 26(3): 393–418.
- "The Production of Distinctions: Class, Gender and Taste Work in the Lifestyle Management Industry." Qualitative Sociology 34(1): 201–219.
- "Beyond Interaction: Customer Influence on Housekeeping and Room Service Work in Hotels." Work, Employment and Society 25(1): 19–33.

=== Co-authored articles ===
- Voss, Kim and Sherman, Rachel. "Breaking the Iron Law of Oligarchy: Tactical Innovation and the Revitalization of the American Labor Movement." American Journal of Sociology. 106:2 (September 2000).

=== Co-authored book chapters ===
- Carter, Bob; Fairbrother, Peter; Sherman, Rachel; and Voss, Kim. "Made in the USA, Imported into Britain: The Organizing Model and the Limits of Transferability." In Research in the Sociology of Work. Vol. 11: Labor Revitalization: Global Perspectives and New Initiatives. Dan Cornfield and Holly McCammon, eds. Kidlington, Oxford, U.K.: JAI Press, 2003. ISBN 0-7623-0882-6
- Voss, Kim and Sherman, Rachel. "Organize or Die: New Organizing Tactics and Immigrant Workers." In Organizing Immigrants: The Challenge for Unions in Contemporary California. Ruth Milkman, ed. Ithaca, N.Y.: Cornell University Press, 2000. ISBN 0-8014-3697-4
- Voss, Kim and Sherman, Rachel. "You Can't Just Do it Automatically: The Transition to Social Movement Unionism in the United States." In Trade Unions in Renewal: A Comparative Study. Peter Fairbrother and Charlotte A.B. Yates, eds. London: Continuum, 2003. ISBN 0-8264-5436-4
