= Ethnography (journal) =

Peer-reviewed academic journal

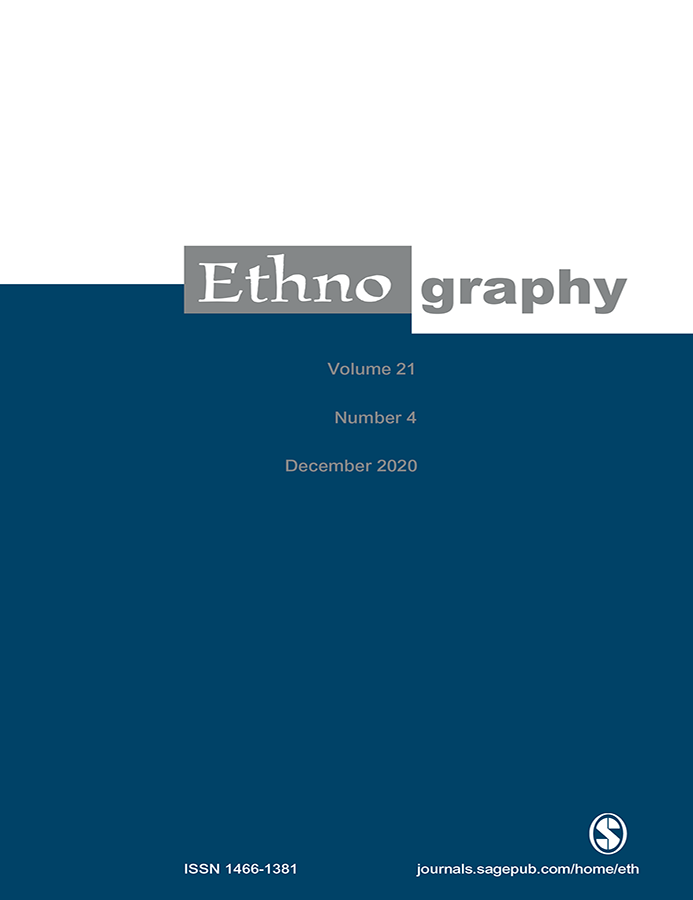
- Discipline: Anthropology, archaeology
- Language: English
- Edited by: Sarah Bracke, Francio Guadeloupe

Publication details
- History: 2000-present
- Publisher: SAGE Publications
- Frequency: Quarterly
- Impact factor: 1.041 (2014)

Standard abbreviations
- ISO 4: Ethnography

Indexing
- ISSN: 1466-1381 (print); 1741-2714 (web)
- LCCN: 00251150
- OCLC no.: 60338214

Links
- Journal homepage; Online access; Online archive

Ethnography is a peer-reviewed academic journal covering the field of ethnography. The editors-in-chief are Sarah Bracke (University of Amsterdam) and Francio Guadeloupe (University of Amsterdam). It was established in 2000 and is published by SAGE Publications.

== Abstracting and indexing ==
The journal is abstracted and indexed in Scopus and the Social Sciences Citation Index. According to the Journal Citation Reports, its 2014 impact factor is 1.041.
