= Francio Guadeloupe =

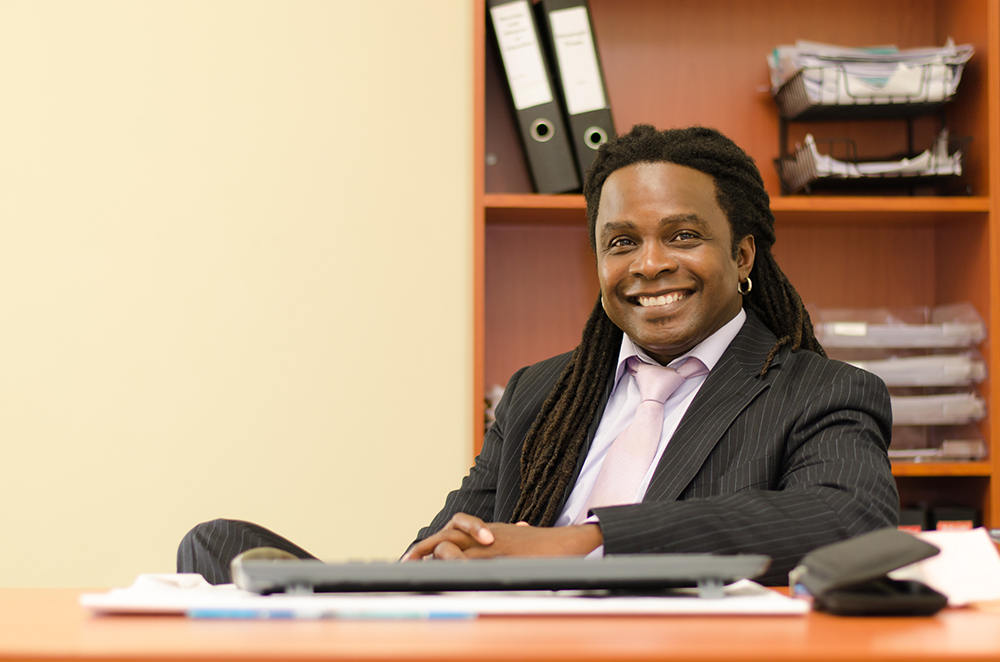
Dr. Francio Guadeloupe

Dr. Francio Guadeloupe, a social & cultural anthropologist and development sociologist by training, is the President of the University of St. Martin in Philipsburg, Sint Maarten on the bi-national island of Sint Maarten & Saint Martin (Dutch and French Caribbean). Guadeloupe's work can be described as a scholarship of possibilities seeking to undo the guiding fictions of "race", sexism, and the naturalization of class hierarchies that have become entrenched in our thinking, behavior, and institutional arrangements. His method is best captured in this axiom translated from a Dutch article published in the journal Sociale Vraagstukken in 2012:

I do not do the good I want to do, but the evil I do not want to do—this I keep on not doing. Let me explain this slowly, I do not do the good I want to do (creating the good of a raceless society in its historically constituted terms, so, practically speaking, doing Dutch society's reality of race differently), but the evil I do not want to do (which is thinking and doing in terms of race)—this I keep on not doing (so not doing race at all).

Guadeloupe's Via Negativa mode of doing anthropology is influenced by his training at the Radboud University in the Netherlands. There under the guidance of Gerrit Huizer, he was introduced to an unorthodox understanding of the link between Liberation Theology and Marxism. In private conversations, Huizer taught Guadeloupe to appreciate Liberation Theology as Marxism decorated with the best of Christian redemptive politics. Conversely, in accordance with a materialist interpretation of Hegel, Marxism was Christianity finally returning to its radical roots. Guadeloupe resolved these contending definitions in Caribbean fashion by radicalizing both traditions. In Guadeloupe's reading, Christianity and Marxism are both products of planetary creolization: the clash of the peoples of the earth leading to agonistic borrowings and transpositions, as such they are cosmopolitan rather than European and Middle Eastern traditions. Marxism and Liberation Theology are common names for the Social Question and the continuous interrogation of Being and Becoming that meet other traditions such as those concerned with racism and patriarchy. All this is connected to Guadeloupe's predilection for the American pragmatist tradition.

One finds a succinct expose of Guadeloupe's philosophy of science in his video message on the Wake UP call interview and its translation in a book on nation building on Sint Maarten

== Selected publications ==
- F. E. Guadeloupe (2015). Superdiversity as the recognition of the ordinary mischievous sacred. In M. A. George & S. S. Scatolini (Eds.), Language, culture and education: a collection of papers in applied linguistics, cultural anthropology, and educational studies (pp. 21–28). Oman: Euro-Khaleeji research and publishing house.
- F. E. Guadeloupe (2015, September 10). The New Black Peter is the Refugee washing up on the shores of Fortress Europe. Sint Maarten Island Times
- F. E. Guadeloupe (2015, April 14). No Democratization without Decolonization. St. Martin News Network
- F. E. Guadeloupe (2014). Reparaties als een hedendaagse uiting van de permanente revolutie: een standpunt. Bijdragen en Mededelingen betreffende de Geschiedenis der Nederlanden, 129 (4), 106-117.
- F. E. Guadeloupe & V. A. de Rooij (2014). The promise of a utopian home, or capitalism's commoditization of blackness. Social Analysis, 58 (2), 60-77.
- F. E. Guadeloupe & V. A. de Rooij (2014). Pimping and the deconstruction of the natural: a perspective from Saint Martin and Sint Maarten (SXM). Women's Studies International Forum, 43, 5-12
- F. E. Guadeloupe (2013). The Netherlands, a Caribbean island: an autoethnographic account. Agathos, 4 (2), 83-98.
- F. E. Guadeloupe (2013). Curaçaons on the question of home: the lure of autochthony and its alternatives. In L. Lewis (Ed.), Caribbean sovereignty, development and democracy in an age of globalization (Routledge advances in international relations and global politics, 100) (pp. 189-207). New York [etc.]: Routledge.
- F. E. Guadeloupe (2012). It is not where you are from, but where you are at: Rastafari as a politics of human dignity. In N. Faraclas, R. Severing, C. Weijer & E. Echteld (Eds.), Proceedings of the ECICC-conference Guyana 2001. - Vol. 1: Multiplex cultures and citizenships: multiple perspectives on language, literature, education and society in the ABC-Islands and beyond (pp. 45-54). Willemstad: Fundashon pa Planifikashon di Idioma (FPI) / University of the Netherlands Antilles (UNA).
- F. E. Guadeloupe (2010). Culture blind social justice: leftist politics in practice. Waterstof : Krant van Waterland, 54.
- F. E. Guadeloupe (2010). The national thing is a scenario not made for we third world massive: a case of working-class youth on Saint Maarten & Sint Maarten emancipating their minds from exclusive nationalism. Transforming Anthropology, 18 (2), 157-168.
- F. E. Guadeloupe (2010). Adieu aan de nikkers, koelies en makambas: een pleidooi voor de deconstructie van raciaal denken binnen de Nederlandse Caraïbistiek. Nijmegen: CIDIN, Radboud Universiteit Nijmegen.
- F. E. Guadeloupe (2010). The religion of the urban cool. Sociétés et jeunesses en difficulté.
- F. E. Guadeloupe (2010). Koninkrijksrelaties: Yes we can! Justitiële Verkenningen, 36 (6), 57-63.
- F. E. Guadeloupe (2009). Their modernity matters too: the invisible links between Black Atlantic identity formations in the Caribbean and consumer capitalism. Latin American and Caribbean Ethnic Studies, 4 (3), 271-292.
- F. E. Guadeloupe (2009). Chanting down the new Jerusalem: calypso, Christianity, and capitalism in the Caribbean (The anthropology of Christianity, 4). Berkeley, CA: University of California Press.
- F. E. Guadeloupe (2009). "I is just myself": Writing the Individual in the Anthropology of the Caribbean, Etnofoor.
- F.E Guadeloupe (2009). The Sonic Architects of the New Tower of Babel, in: Birgit Meyer (ed), Aesthetic Formations: Media, Religion, and the Senses. London: Palgrave Publishers.
- F. E. Guadeloupe (2009). Chanting Down the New Jerusalem: Calypso, Christianity, and Capitalism in the Caribbean. Berkeley: University of California Press.
- F. E. Guadeloupe (2008). DJ Fernando Clarke's Two Vitamin C for Successful Living: Calypso and Christianity. in: Rivke Jaffe (Ed), The Caribbean City. Kingston: Ian Randle Publishers.
- F. E. Guadeloupe & V. A. de Rooij (2007).Zo zijn onze manieren. Visies op multiculturaliteit in Nederland. Rozenberg, Amsterdam.
- F. E. Guadeloupe (2007). - De zon van multi-culturaliteit: Accepteren van wie we zijn. In: Francio Guadeloupe & Vincent de Rooij (Eds), Zo Zijn Onze Manieren...visies of multiculturaliteit in Nederland. Amsterdam: Rozenberg Publishers.
- F. E. Guadeloupe (2006). 'Carmelita's In-possible Dance: another style of Christianity in the capitalist ridden Caribbean', Journal for the Study of Religion 19 (1): 5-22.
- F. E. Guadeloupe (2006). What the Tamarind Tree Whispers: notes on a pedagogy of tragedy, in: Maria Cijntje-van Enckevort, Sergio Scatollini Apostolo & Milton George (eds.), St. Martin Studies Volume 1. Phillipsburg: University of St. Martin press. 101-104
- F. E. Guadeloupe (2006). 'Love when Love could not be: an example of romantic love from the Caribbean', Etnofoor 19, Issue (1): 63-70.
- F. E. Guadeloupe (2006) 'Drumstokjes, drums en Antilliaanse jongeren: over een brassband, consumptie en racisme', Mensenstreken 8 (2): 20-22.
- F. E. Guadeloupe (2005). 'Globalization and Autochthony: seamy sides for the same coin', in: Lammert de Jong & Douwe Boersma (eds), The Kingdom of the Netherlands in the Caribbean: what's next? Amsterdam: Rozenberg Publishers.
- F. E. Guadeloupe (2005). 'Introducing an Anti-national Pragmatist on Saint Martin', in: Lammert de Jong & Dirk Kruijt (eds), Caribbean Pains and Pleasures. Amsterdam: Rozenberg Publishers.
- F. E. Guadeloupe & M. Milder (1999). Dansen om te Leven: over Afro-Braziliaanse spiritualiteit en cultuur. Heeswijk: Dabar-Luyten.
- Francio Guadeloupe (1999). 'A Vida e uma Dança: the Candomblé through the lives of two Cariocas', occasional paper.Nijmegen: Third World Centre/Radboud University Nijmegen.
