= Policy sociology =

Theory of sociology pertaining to providing solutions to social problems

Policy sociology is a term coined by Michael Burawoy referring to a way of providing solutions to social problems. Goals are usually defined by a client, which could be the government. Policy sociology provides instrumental knowledge, that is, knowledge that can be used to solve or help a specific case in the social world. According to Burawoy, the information gathered from policy sociology is open to an extra-academic audience. It is not confined to academic boundaries. The findings of policy sociology research are likely to have an effect on the general public as they could influence government policy.

In recent year, policy sociology has been a popular research methodology for analysing educational policies. Sometimes it is also called critical policy sociology.
