= Commodity chain =

Agricultural and industrial production process

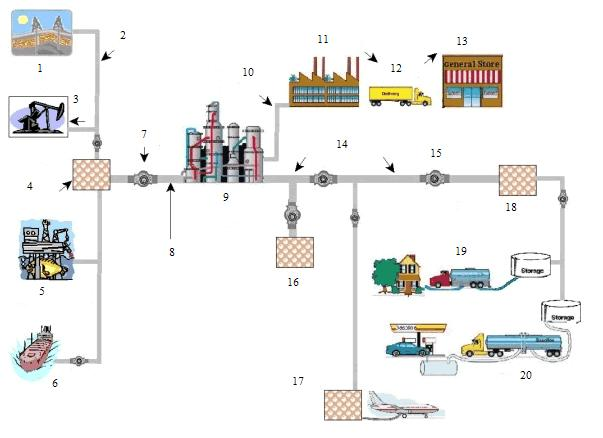

A commodity chain is a process used by firms to gather resources, transform them into goods or commodities, and finally, distribute them to consumers. It is a series of links connecting the many places of production and distribution and resulting in a commodity that is then exchanged on the world market. In short, it is the connected path from which a good travels from producers to consumers. Commodity chains can be unique depending on the product types or the types of markets. Different stages of a commodity chain can also involve different economic sectors or be handled by the same business.

A number of commentators have remarked that in the Internet age commodity chains are becoming increasingly more transparent. The Wikichain.org project has adopted the same wiki technology used by Wikipedia in order to help make commodity chains more transparent. "They are a network of labour and production processes whose end result is a finished commodity." —William Jones Esq.

A commodity chain demonstrates that each link of an extended chain of production and consumption links between resource producers and suppliers, various manufacturers, traders and shippers, wholesalers, and retailers. Rather than a linear chain, a circuit-board is a better metaphor for this concept because things are interconnected in so many ways, not just a mere straight line. This source explains global commodity chains in depth.

== See also ==
- Supply chain
- Value chain
