= Felony disenfranchisement in the United States =

Overview on felons voting in elections in the United States

Disenfranchisement laws per US State based on felony conviction as of February 2026

In the United States, a person might have their voting rights suspended or withdrawn due to a conviction for committing a criminal offense. The actual class of crimes that results in disenfranchisement vary between jurisdictions, but is most commonly classed as felonies, or may be based on a certain period of incarceration or other penalty. In some jurisdictions disfranchisement is permanent, while in others suffrage is restored after a person has served a sentence, or completed parole or probation. Felony disenfranchisement is one among the collateral consequences of criminal conviction and the loss of rights due to conviction for criminal offense. In 2016, 6.1 million individuals were disenfranchised on account of a conviction, 2.47% of voting-age citizens. As of October 2020, it was estimated that 5.1 million voting-age US citizens were disenfranchised for the 2020 presidential election on account of a felony conviction, 1 in 44 citizens. As suffrage rights are generally bestowed by state law, state felony disenfranchisement laws also apply to elections to federal offices.

Proponents have argued that persons who commit felonies have broken the social contract, and have thereby given up their right to participate in a civil society. Some argue that felons have shown poor judgment, and that they should therefore not have a voice in the political decision-making process. Opponents have argued that such disfranchisement restricts and conflicts with principles of universal suffrage. It can affect civic and communal participation in general. Opponents argue that felony disenfranchisement can create political incentives to skew criminal law in favor of disproportionately targeting groups who are political opponents of those who hold power.

Many states adopted felon voting bans in the 1860s and 1870s, at the same time that voting rights for African Americans citizens were being considered and contested. Scholars have linked the origins and intents of many state felon voting bans to racial discrimination. In some states, legislators have been accused of specifically tailoring felon voting bans to purposely and disproportionately target African Americans, for example, by targeting minor crimes more common among these citizens while allowing felons who committed more serious crimes (such as murder) to vote.

== History ==
The first US felony provisions were introduced in 1792 in Kentucky, although the first actual law disenfranchising felons was introduced by Connecticut in 1818. By 1840, four states (Note: In addition to Connecticut, Virginia (which then included West Virginia) introduced laws disenfranchising felons in 1830, Delaware in 1831, and Ohio in 1835. Like Kentucky, Ohio had provisions for felony disfranchisement in its first constitution from 1803, but they remained unused until 1835.) had felony disenfranchisement policies. By the American Civil War, about 24 states had some form of felony disenfranchisement policy or similar provision in the state constitution, although only eighteen actually disenfranchised felons. (Note: Every free state admitted to the Union between 1838 and the Civil War — Iowa, Wisconsin, California, Minnesota, Oregon and Kansas — had felony disfranchisement from before statehood. Rhode Island introduced felony disfranchisement laws in 1841, New Jersey in 1844, Louisiana with a new Constitution in 1845, New York in 1847, Maryland and Kentucky in 1851, Indiana in 1852, and Pennsylvania in 1860.) The Fourteenth Amendment was adopted in 1868, and by 1870 the number had increased to 28 (out of 38 states).

The surge of felony disenfranchisement laws after the Civil War led many to conclude that the laws were implemented as part of a strategy to disenfranchise African Americans, especially as the policy was expanded in conjunction with the Black Codes, which established severe penalties for petty crimes and especially targeted African Americans.

As of 2018, most U.S. states had policies to restore voting rights upon completion of a sentence. Only a couple states — Iowa, and Virginia specifically — permanently disenfranchised a felony convict and 6 other states limited restoration based on crimes of "moral turpitude".

The US Supreme Court in Richardson v. Ramirez (1974), interpreted section 2 of the Fourteenth Amendment as permitting states to disenfranchise convicted criminals, leaving them to decide which crimes would be grounds for disenfranchisement, which are not restricted to felonies, though in most cases they do. Felons who have completed their sentences are allowed to vote in most states. Between 1996 and 2008, 28 states changed their laws on felon voting rights, mostly to restore rights or to simplify the process of restoration. Since 2008, state laws have continued to shift, both curtailing and restoring voter rights, sometimes over short periods of time within the same state.

== Recent statistics ==
As of 2008, over 5.3 million people in the United States were denied the right to vote due to felony disenfranchisement. In the national elections in 2012, the various state felony disenfranchisement laws together blocked an estimated 5.85 million felons from voting, up from 1.2 million in 1976. This comprised 2.5% of the potential voters in general. The state with the highest number of disenfranchised voters was Florida, with 1.5 million disenfranchised because of a current or previous felony conviction, over 10% of the voting age citizens, including the 774,000 disenfranchised only because of outstanding financial obligations. In October 2020, it was estimated that 5.1 million citizens were disenfranchised for the 2020 presidential election on account of a felony conviction, 1 in 44 citizens. Nearly 4.1 million people are disenfranchised as of 2026.

Less than 0.5% 0.5–1% 1.5–2.5% 2.5–3.5% 3.5–4.5% 4.5–5.5% 5.5–8.5% 8.5–9.5% More than 9.5%

2016 estimates of disenfranchised individuals with felony convictions
State	In prison	On parole	On felony probation	In jail	Post-sentence	Total	Voting age population	Percent
Alabama	30,585	6,580	15,626	1,578	231,896	286,266	3,755,483	7.62%
Alaska	5,497	2,035	6,900	7	-	14,439	552,166	2.61%
Arizona	44,509	7,241	51,362	1,341	116,717	221,170	5,205,215	4.25%
Arkansas	19,224	21,811	24,695	975	-	66,705	2,272,904	2.93%
California	136,302	86,254	-	-	-	222,557	30,023,902	0.74%
Colorado	21,207	8,673	-	1,066	-	30,946	4,199,509	0.74%
Connecticut	14,926	2,419	-	-	-	17,345	2,826,827	0.61%
Delaware	6,858	716	4,074	-	4,067	15,716	741,548	2.12%
Florida	102,555	4,208	86,886	4,822	1,487,847	1,686,318	16,166,143	10.43%
Georgia	50,900	23,545	170,194	4,112	-	248,751	7,710,688	3.23%
Hawaii	6,364	-	-	-	-	6,364	1,120,770	0.57%
Idaho	7,873	5,057	9,863	314	-	23,206	1,222,093	1.89%
Illinois	47,537	-	-	2,089	-	49,625	9,901,322	0.50%
Iowa	9,127	6,133	12,365	410	23,976	52,012	2,395,103	2.17%
Indiana	28,028	-	-	1,630	-	29,658	5,040,224	0.59%
Kansas	9,466	4,023	3,426	679	-	17,594	2,192,084	0.80%
Kentucky	22,968	16,729	27,323	2,039	242,987	312,046	3,413,425	9.14%
Louisiana	35,614	31,450	37,761	3,211	-	108,035	3,555,911	3.04%
Maine	-	-	-	-	-	-	1,072,948	0.00%
Maryland	20,378	-	-	1,087	-	21,465	4,658,175	0.46%
Massachusetts	10,254	-	-	921	-	11,176	5,407,335	0.21%
Michigan	42,661	-	-	1,560	-	44,221	7,715,272	0.57%
Minnesota	11,369	8,148	43,215	608	-	63,340	4,205,207	1.51%
Mississippi	13,752	8,051	28,463	1,422	166,494	218,181	2,265,485	9.63%
Missouri	32,768	16,808	38,870	1,219	-	89,665	4,692,196	1.91%
Montana	3,816	-	-	330	-	4,146	806,529	0.51%
North Carolina	37,446	10,977	40,867	1,888	-	91,179	7,752,234	1.18%
North Dakota	2,042	-	-	136	-	2,178	583,001	0.37%
Nebraska	6,377	782	2,952	384	7,069	17,564	1,425,853	1.23%
Nevada	11,560	6,828	8,097	701	62,080	89,267	2,221,681	4.02%
New Hampshire	2,856	-	-	175	-	3,031	1,066,610	0.28%
New Jersey	19,964	14,831	58,123	1,396	-	94,315	6,959,192	1.36%
New Mexico	7,205	2,838	13,352	891	-	24,286	1,588,201	1.53%
New York	50,513	44,590	-	2,477	-	97,581	15,584,974	0.63%
Ohio	51,102	-	-	1,736	-	52,837	8,984,946	0.59%
Oklahoma	27,857	2,572	26,475	1,398	-	58,302	2,950,017	1.98%
Oregon	14,228	-	-	519	-	14,748	3,166,121	0.47%
Pennsylvania	49,269	-	-	3,705	-	52,974	10,112,229	0.52%
Rhode Island	3,355	-	-	-	-	3,355	845,254	0.40%
South Carolina	20,141	4,621	21,464	1,011	-	47,238	3,804,558	1.24%
South Dakota	3,464	2,643	4,114	170	-	10,392	647,145	1.61%
Tennessee	29,271	13,186	52,654	2,763	323,354	421,224	5,102,688	8.26%
Texas	161,658	111,632	216,033	6,605	-	495,928	20,257,343	2.45%
Utah	6,925	-	-	744	-	7,669	2,083,423	0.37%
Vermont	-	-	-	-	-	-	506,119	0.00%
Virginia	38,694	1,604	56,908	2,905	408,570	508,680	6,512,571	7.81%
Washington	18,395	3,811	25,164	1,182	-	48,552	5,558,509	0.87%
West Virginia	7,042	3,187	4,109	389	-	14,727	1,464,532	1.01%
Wisconsin	22,851	19,537	22,101	1,118	-	65,606	4,476,711	1.47%
Wyoming	2,536	607	3,148	141	17,414	23,847	447,212	5.33%
Total	1,329,288	504,127	1,116,585	63,855	3,092,471	6,106,327	247,219,588	2.47%

== Reform efforts ==
Challenges to felony disenfranchisement laws began in the 1950s as part of the effort of advocating for a shift from retribution to rehabilitation in the American penal system. After the latter part of the 1950s, the ratio of states disenfranchising those convicted of crimes decreased; in the twentieth century, some categories of felons were disenfranchised while others were not and several state laws were revised to provide a broader criminal coverage. Disenfranchisement laws have been amended, since 1997, by 23 states. These reforms take three forms: repeal of lifetime disenfranchisement laws; expansion of voting rights; and simplification of the process of restoring voting rights post-incarceration.

In 2002, Representative Maxine Waters (D, CA) introduced H.R.2830, the Voting Restoration Act, to congress.

From 1997 to 2008, there was a trend to lift the disenfranchisement restrictions, or simplify the procedures for applying for the restoration of civil rights for people who had fulfilled their punishments for felonies. As a result, in 2008, more than a half-million people had the right to vote who would have been disenfranchised under prior restrictions.

Felony disenfranchisement was a topic of debate during the 2012 Republican presidential primary. Primary candidate Rick Santorum from Pennsylvania argued for the restoration of voting rights for convicted felons who had completed sentences and parole or probation. Santorum's position was attacked and distorted by Mitt Romney, who alleged that Santorum supported voting rights for felons while incarcerated. Former President Barack Obama supports voting rights for ex-offenders.

In a report submitted to the United Nations Human Rights Committee in 2013, a coalition of non-profit civil rights and criminal justice organizations argued that US felony disenfranchisement laws are in violation of Articles 25 and 26 of the International Covenant on Civil and Political Rights (ICCPR), ratified by the United States in 1992.

In 2017, Senator Benjamin L. Cardin (D, MD) introduced S. 1588, the Democracy Restoration Act of 2017 to Congress.

Felony disenfranchisement reforms between 1997 and 2018 have resulted in 1.4 million Americans regaining voting rights.

During the 2020 Democratic presidential primary, candidate Bernie Sanders argued that all felons should be allowed to vote from prison. His home state of Vermont is one of only two states (with Maine) that do not disenfranchise felons while in prison.

=== Florida ===
In November 2018, Florida voters approved Amendment 4, an amendment to the Florida constitution to automatically restore voting rights to convicted felons who have served their sentences. In July 2019, Republicans in Florida's state legislature enacted S. 7066, which stipulates that felons must pay all outstanding fines, fees, and restitutions before they are deemed to have “served their sentence” and thus regain their right to vote. On February 19, 2020, a 3-judge panel of the U.S. Court of Appeals for the Eleventh Circuit ruled that it was unconstitutional to force Floridian felons to first pay their financial obligations off before reregistering to vote. However, on September 11, 2020, the U.S. Court of Appeals for the Eleventh Circuit overturned the lower court ruling that all fines do not have to be paid off before felons can be re-enfranchised. The appeals court ruling had the effect of again disenfranchising around 774,000 people, about a month before the 2020 U.S. presidential election. In late September 2020, former New York City mayor Michael Bloomberg put a fund of over $16 million together to be used towards helping convicted felons vote in Florida by paying their outstanding fines and fees. Bloomberg's fund as well as the $5 million raised by the Florida Rights Restoration Coalition paid the outstanding fines off of around 32,000 felons.

=== Iowa ===
Iowa's constitution provides for permanent felony disenfranchisement. However, in July 2005, Iowa's Democratic Governor Tom Vilsack issued an executive order restoring voting rights of all people who had completed supervision, which was upheld by Iowa's Supreme Court on October 31, 2005. However, on his inauguration day, January 14, 2011, Republican Governor Terry Branstad reversed Vilsack's executive order, again disenfranchising thousands of people. As of January 2020, Iowa was the only state to impose a lifetime felony voting ban, regardless of the crime committed. On August 5, 2020, Iowa Republican Governor Kim Reynolds signed an executive order restoring voting rights to about 24,000 people who had completed their sentences, except for those convicted of murder. Reynolds also urged Iowa lawmakers to amend Iowa's constitution to end permanent felony disenfranchisement.

=== Kentucky ===
In December 2019, Kentucky's newly elected Democratic governor, Andy Beshear, signed an executive order to restore voting rights and the right to hold public office to more than 140,000 residents who have completed sentences for nonviolent felonies. This order did not extend to those convicted of violent felonies. Individuals convicted under federal law or the laws of other states must apply individually for restoration of their rights.

=== Nevada ===
In 2019, the legislature introduced AB 431 which was passed and signed into law, taking effect on July 1, 2019, which restored the right to vote for felons who were no longer serving a prison sentence in Nevada.

=== Tennessee ===
The Campaign Legal Center (CLC), as part of its national "Restore Your Vote Campaign," is actively engaged in restoring voting rights to disenfranchised felons in Tennessee, and filed a lawsuit (Falls v. Goins) on behalf of 2 citizens of Tennesseeans against the state.

As part of discussions in the Tennessee General Assembly in 2019-2020 about a bill aimed at reforming Tennessee's restoration process, a joint policy brief compiled by libertarian political advocacy group Americans for Prosperity, the Tennessee public policy think tank Think Tennessee, and Nashville-based reintegration organization Project Return, was submitted to the Constitutional Protections & Sentencing Subcommittee but failed to pass. The brief discusses numerous benefits of voting rights restoration for felons, including saving tax money and reducing recidivism, as well as potential enfranchisement strategies.

Most recently, on August 20, 2020, Tennessee Governor Bill Lee signed H.B. 8005 and S.B. 8005, increasing the penalty for camping on unapproved state property from a misdemeanor to a Class E felony, punishable by up to 6 years in prison and an automatic loss of voting rights, as per Tennessee law. This move was a result of a 2-month-long protest against institutional racism and police brutality that involved a round-the-clock encampment on Capitol grounds.

=== Virginia ===
The Virginia legislature in 2017 debated relaxation of the state's policy that the restoration of voting rights requires an individual act by the governor. In 2026, Virginia voters passed Question 3, which restores voting rights to all formerly-incarcerated individuals after release from prison. Previously, formerly-incarcerated individuals had to apply to the governor for restoration. This change takes into effect on January 1, 2027.

== Constitutionality ==
Unlike most laws that burden the right of citizens to vote based on some form of social status, felony disenfranchisement laws have been held to be constitutional. In Richardson v. Ramirez (1974), the United States Supreme Court upheld the constitutionality of felon disenfranchisement statutes, finding that the practice did not deny equal protection to disenfranchised voters. The Court looked to Section 2 of the Fourteenth Amendment to the United States Constitution, which proclaims that States in which adult male citizens are denied the right to vote for any reason other than "participation in rebellion, or other crime" will suffer a reduction in the basis of their representation in Congress. Based on this language, the Court found that this amounted to an "affirmative sanction" of the practice of felon disenfranchisement, and the 14th Amendment could not prohibit in one section that which is expressly authorized in another.

But critics of the practice, such as The United States Commission on Civil Rights, The Lawyers‘ Committee for Civil Rights Under Law and The Sentencing Project, among others, argue that Section 2 of the 14th Amendment allows, but does not represent an endorsement of, felony disenfranchisement statutes as constitutional in light of the Equal Protection Clause and is limited only to the issue of reduced representation. The Court ruled in Hunter v. Underwood 471 U.S. 222, 232 (1985) that a state's crime disenfranchisement provision will violate Equal Protection if it can be demonstrated that the provision, as enacted, had "both [an] impermissible racial motivation and racially discriminatory impact." (The law in question also disenfranchised people convicted of vagrancy, adultery, and any misdemeanor "involving moral turpitude"; the test case involved two individuals who faced disenfranchisement for presenting invalid checks, which the state authorities had found to be morally turpid behavior.) A felony disenfranchisement law, which on its face is indiscriminate in nature, cannot be invalidated by the Supreme Court unless its enforcement is proven to racially discriminate and to have been enacted with racially discriminatory animus.

== Classifications ==
Restoration of voting rights for people who are ex-offenders varies across the United States. Primary classification of voting rights include:

=== No disenfranchisement ===
2 states: Maine and Vermont, as well as the District of Columbia, have unrestricted voting rights for felons. They allow people to vote during incarceration, via absentee ballot, and have no specific restrictions upon completion of their sentence.

=== Ends after release ===
In 23 states, disenfranchisement ends after incarceration is complete: California, Colorado, Connecticut, Hawaii, Illinois, Indiana, Maryland, Massachusetts, Michigan, Minnesota, Montana, Nevada, New Hampshire, New Jersey, New York, New Mexico, North Dakota, Ohio, Oregon, Pennsylvania, Rhode Island, Utah, and Washington.

=== Ends after parole or probation ===
14 states require not only that incarceration, if any, be complete but also that any parole or probation sentence (the latter of which is often an alternative to incarceration) be complete: Alaska, Arkansas, Georgia, Idaho, Kansas, Louisiana, Missouri, North Carolina, Oklahoma, South Carolina, South Dakota, Texas, West Virginia (the prosecutor can request the court to revoke voting rights if financial obligations are unmet), and Wisconsin.

=== Circumstantial ===
Nine states have laws that relate disenfranchisement to the detail of the crime. These laws restore voting rights to some offenders on the completion of incarceration, parole, and probation. Other offenders must make an individual petition that could be denied.

State	Laws
Alabama	A person convicted of a felony loses the ability to vote if the felony involves moral turpitude. Prior to 2017, the state Attorney General and courts have decided this for individual crimes; however, in 2017, moral turpitude was defined by House Bill 282 of 2017, signed into law by Kay Ivey on May 24, to constitute 47 specific offenses. If a convicted person loses the ability to vote based on having committed a defined act of moral turpitude, he can petition to have it restored by a pardon or by a certificate of eligibility; if the loss of elective franchise was based on a crime not under moral turpitude, eligibility to vote is automatically restored once all sentence conditions have been satisfied. Prior to 2017, a person convicted of a number of crimes having to do with sexual assault or abuse was ineligible to receive a certificate of eligibility; today, only impeachment and treason remain ineligible for a certificate of eligibility.
Arizona	Rights are restored to first-time felony offenders. Others must petition.
Delaware	The following crimes require a pardon: murder or manslaughter (except vehicular homicide), an offense against public administration involving bribery or improper influence or abuse of office anywhere in the US, or a felony sexual offense (anywhere in the USA). All other convicted felons regain the right to vote after completion of the full sentence.
Florida	A convicted person permanently loses suffrage if their crime was murder or any sexual offense. In January 2019, the lifetime voting ban was lifted for those convicted of lesser crimes upon completion of sentence, including prison, parole, and probation. A law in June 2019 provides that a sentence is not completed until all fines, fees and restitution have been paid.
Iowa	A person convicted of any "infamous crime" shall not be eligible to vote again in their lifetime under Article II, Section 5 of Iowa's state constitution. The Iowa Supreme Court has interpreted this to mean any felony conviction, but the governor also has the authority under Article IV, Section 16 to restore any citizenship rights lost upon conviction, including right to vote. On August 5, 2020, Governor Kim Reynolds signed an executive order to restore the right to vote to convicts upon release from their sentence.
Mississippi	A convicted person loses suffrage for numerous crimes identified in the state constitution, Section 241 (see note). The list is given below. Suffrage can be restored to an individual by a two-thirds vote of both houses of the legislature. The crimes that disqualify a person from voting are given in Section 241 of the state constitution as: murder, rape, bribery, theft, arson, obtaining money or goods under false pretense, perjury, forgery, embezzlement or bigamy.
Nebraska	A convicted person permanently loses suffrage if they are convicted of treason; voting rights for all other offenders are restored two years after completion of incarceration, parole, or probation.
Tennessee	A person who is convicted of certain felonies may not regain voting rights except through pardon. These include: murder, rape, treason, and voting fraud. For a person convicted of a lesser felony, disenfranchisement ends after terms of incarceration, completion of parole, and completion of probation. In addition, the person must pay "Any court order restitution paid; current in the payment of any child support obligations; and/or Any court ordered court costs paid". The ex-offender must either obtain a court order restoring their right to vote or complete the certificate of restoration of voting rights.
Wyoming	Since July 1, 2017, non-violent felons have had their suffrage restored upon completion of their sentence including parole and probation. Non-violent felons who completed their sentence before January 1, 2010, or those convicted out of state must submit a written request to the department of corrections who will determine if their sentence was completed before restoring their voting rights.

=== Individual petitions required ===
Two states require felons to petition to the court for restoration of voting after all offenses.

State	Laws
Kentucky	Although, in December 2019, Kentucky's Democratic governor signed an executive order restoring the vote and the right to hold public office to more than 140,000 residents who have completed sentences for nonviolent felonies, the governor stated his order did not extend to those who committed violent felonies because some offenses, such as rape and murder, were too heinous to forgive. This executive order excludes those convicted under federal law or the laws of other states, although such individuals would be able to apply individually for restoration of their rights.
Virginia	Only the governor can reinstate civil rights. In 2016, Governor Terry McAuliffe restored rights to "individuals who have been convicted of a felony and are no longer incarcerated or under active supervision ... In addition to confirming completion of incarceration and supervised release, the Secretary of the Commonwealth of Virginia considers factors such as active warrants, pre-trial hold, and other concerns that may be flagged by law enforcement. The Governor will review SOC's analysis of each individual's record and will make the final decision on proposed candidates for restoration of rights."

== Racial disparities ==
In 2024, The Sentencing Project reported that felony disenfranchisement disproportionately impacted people of color in the US, estimating that 1 in 22 black adults is ineligible to vote due to their history of criminal offending.

In a 2006 book, scholars Jeff Manza and Christopher Uggen examined the history of disenfranchisement, finding that states in which blacks constituted a larger proportion of the prison population were significantly more likely to adopt or extend laws barring felons from voting. However, they cautioned that many states adopted those laws before Black people could vote, and further noted that individual state histories were too complex to be explained simply by racial issues.

== Economic factors ==
Economic barriers also play a significant role in felony disenfranchisement. Approximately 30 states require individuals to pay legal debts, fines, or restitution before restoring voting rights. This effectively ties the right to vote to financial status, disproportionately disenfranchising those who cannot afford these payments. Critics argue that this practice constitutes a modern-day poll tax and exacerbates inequalities, particularly among economically disadvantaged communities.

== Impact ==
=== Political ===
According to a 2002 study in the American Sociological Review, multiple Senate races and even presidential elections would likely have had different outcomes if felons had not been disenfranchised. A 2021 study in the Journal of Politics found that fewer than one in ten incarcerated eligible voters in Maine and Vermont voted in the 2018 elections, leading the authors to suggest that extending voting rights for those currently imprisoned in other states would likely not have a meaningful impact on those states' elections.

=== Health ===
A 2013 study found that felony disenfranchisement contributes to adverse health outcomes: lack of ability to influence health policy through the electoral process reduces distribution of resources to that group, and contributes to allostatic load, by way of complicating the reintegration process. Studies have shown that living in states with higher levels of radicalized felony disenfranchisement is associated with negative physical health outcomes for African Americans. For instance, a study published in the journal Health Affairs found that higher levels of racial inequality in political disenfranchisement are linked to health problems including depression, physical limitations, and disability. Specifically, Black Americans in these states are more likely to experience functional limitations such as difficulty climbing stairs, performing instrumental activities of daily living (e.g., grocery shopping), and basic daily activities (e.g., eating, dressing, and getting out of bed).

Felony disenfranchisement also has profound mental health implications. The same study mentioned above notes that older African Americans adults living in areas with high levels of radicalized disenfranchisement exhibit higher rates of depressive symptoms and difficulty performing everyday tasks. This suggests a strong correlation between disenfranchisement and mental health outcomes, particularly in the context of systemic racism.

The impact of felony disenfranchisement extends beyond individual health to affect community and social health. Incarceration, which often precedes disenfranchisement, exacerbates health disparities by disrupting social support networks, exacerbating substance abuse and mental health issues, and increasing the risk of infectious diseases. Post-release, the stigma and social exclusion associated with disenfranchisement can further deteriorate health outcomes by severing social relationships and creating barriers to help-seeking behavior.

=== Recidivism ===
A 2012 study argues that felony disenfranchisement "further isolates and segregates ex-felons re-entering into society by denying them the ability to participate in the political process." The denial of voting rights also affects reintegration. A study argues that disenfranchisement isolates ex-felons from society, perpetuating a cycle of marginalization and exclusion. By barring individuals from participating in political processes, these policies hinder societal reintegration and may inadvertently contribute to recidivism.

Research suggests that the self-perceptions of ex-felons play a significant role in their reintegration and likelihood of recidivism. When ex-felons are denied the right to vote, they are more likely to internalize a stigmatized identity as criminals rather than law-abiding citizens. This internalization can set them up for failure and increase the likelihood of recidivism. Studies indicate that felons who succeed in avoiding recidivism are those who learn to see themselves as law-abiding members of the community, a transition that is facilitated by restoring their civic rights, including the right to vote.

Felony disenfranchisement creates significant barriers to community reintegration. Beyond the denial of voting rights, ex-felons often face challenges in securing employment, housing, and accessing various state and federal benefits due to their criminal history. These obstacles exacerbate the difficulties of reintegration and can push individuals back into criminal activities. By restoring voting rights and other civic privileges, states can help alleviate these barriers and support a more successful transition back into society.

== See also ==
- Transgender disenfranchisement in the United States
