= Paul Rock =

Paul Rock may refer to:

- Paul Rock (politician), Welsh politician
- Paul Rock (criminologist), British criminologist
- Paul J. Rock, American Marine Corps lieutenant general
