= Fourteenth Amendment to the United States Constitution =

1868 amendment addressing citizenship rights and civil and political liberties

The Fourteenth Amendment (Amendment XIV) to the United States Constitution was adopted on July 9, 1868, as one of the Reconstruction Amendments. Considered one of the most consequential amendments, it addresses citizenship rights and equal protection under the law at all levels of government. The Fourteenth Amendment was a response to issues affecting freed slaves following the American Civil War, and its enactment was bitterly contested. States of the defeated Confederacy were required to ratify it to regain representation in Congress. The amendment, particularly its first section, is one of the most litigated parts of the Constitution, forming the basis for landmark Supreme Court decisions, such as Brown v. Board of Education (1954; prohibiting racial segregation in public schools), Loving v. Virginia (1967; ending interracial marriage bans), Roe v. Wade (1973; recognizing federal right to abortion until overturned in 2022), Bush v. Gore (2000; settling the 2000 presidential election), Obergefell v. Hodges (2015; extending right to marry to same-sex couples), and Students for Fair Admissions v. Harvard (2023; prohibiting affirmative action in most college admissions).

The amendment's first section includes the Citizenship Clause, Privileges or Immunities Clause, Due Process Clause, and Equal Protection Clause. The Citizenship Clause broadly defines citizenship, superseding the Supreme Court's decision in Dred Scott v. Sandford (1857), which held that Americans descended from African slaves could not become American citizens. The Privileges or Immunities Clause was interpreted in the Slaughter-House Cases (1873) as preventing states from impeding federal rights, such as the freedom of movement. The Due Process Clause builds on the Fifth Amendment to prohibit all levels of government from depriving people of life, liberty, or property without substantive and procedural due process. Additionally, the Due Process Clause supports the incorporation doctrine, by which portions of the Bill of Rights have been applied to the states. The Equal Protection Clause requires each state to provide equal protection under the law to all people, including non-citizens, within its jurisdiction.

The second section superseded the Three-fifths Compromise, apportioning the House of Representatives and Electoral College using each state's adult male population. In allowing states to abridge voting rights "for participation in rebellion, or other crime," this section approved felony disenfranchisement. The third section disqualifies federal and state candidates who "have engaged in insurrection or rebellion," but in Trump v. Anderson (2024), the Supreme Court left its application to Congress for federal elections and state governments for state elections. The fourth section affirms public debt authorized by Congress while declining to compensate slaveholders for emancipation. The fifth section provides congressional power of enforcement, but Congress's authority to regulate private conduct has shifted to the Commerce Clause, while the anti-commandeering doctrine restrains federal interference in state law.

== Section 1: Citizenship and civil rights ==
Section 1. All persons born or naturalized in the United States, and subject to the jurisdiction thereof, are citizens of the United States and of the State wherein they reside. No State shall make or enforce any law which shall abridge the privileges or immunities of citizens of the United States; nor shall any State deprive any person of life, liberty, or property, without due process of law; nor deny to any person within its jurisdiction the equal protection of the laws.

=== Background ===
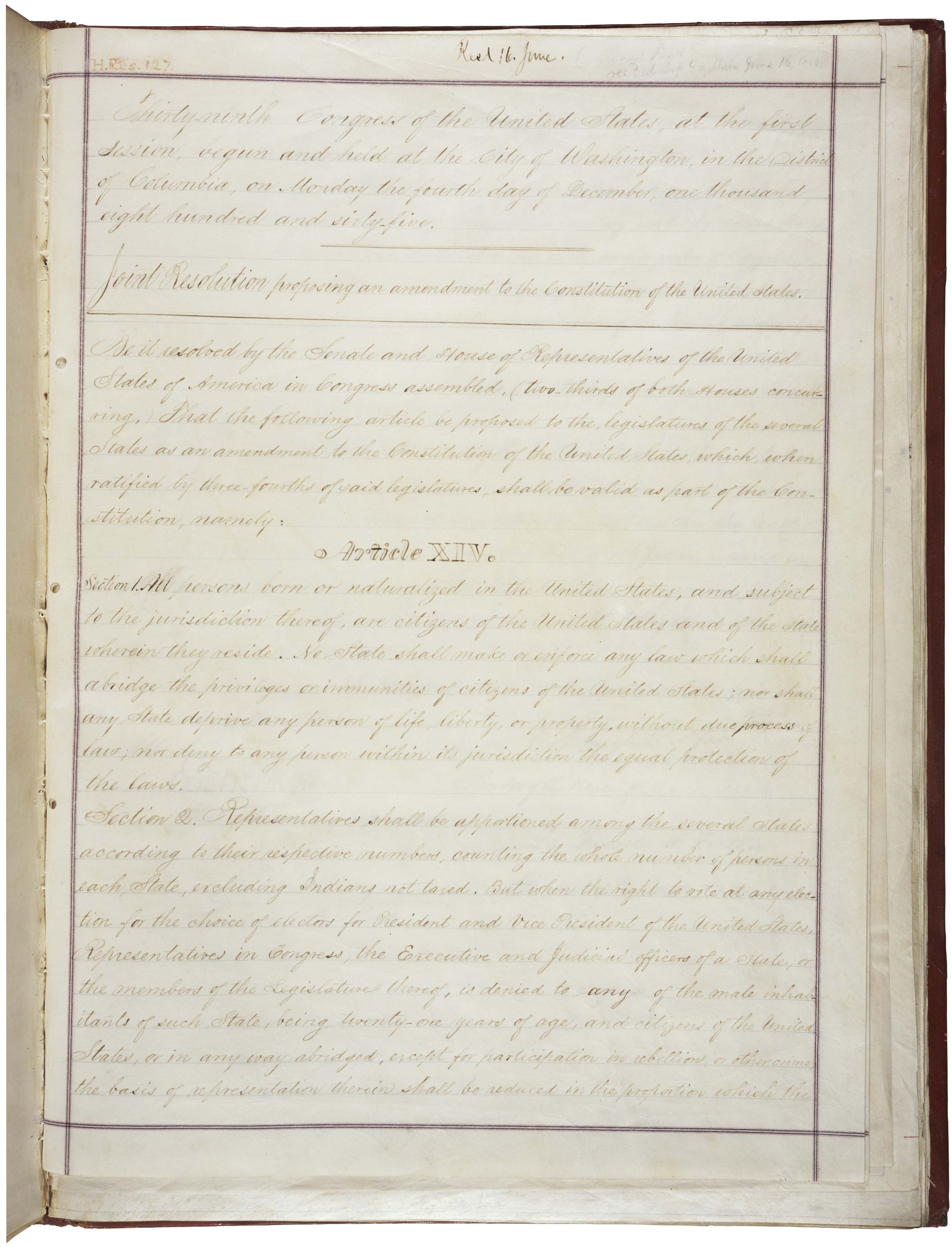
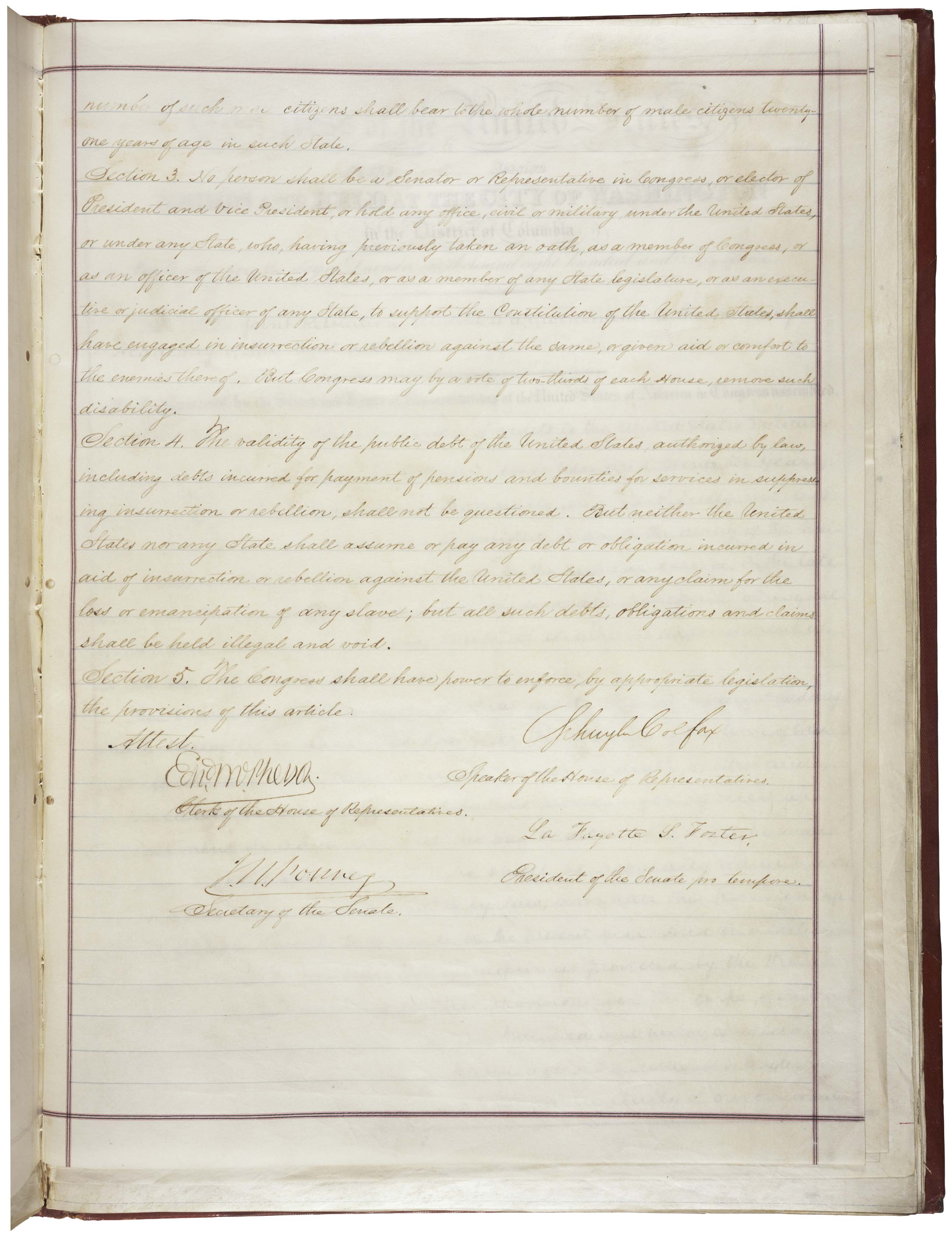
The two pages of the Congressionally-signed original of the Fourteenth Amendment in the National Archives, written with iron gall ink on parchment. It was last publicly displayed in 2013. As of 2025, it is stored in the research wing of the archives inside a boxed book of Acts of Congress from its 39th session.

Section 1 of the Fourteenth Amendment formally defines United States citizenship and protects various civil rights from being abridged or denied by any state law or state action. In Shelley v. Kraemer (1948), the Supreme Court held that the Fourteenth Amendment's historical context of countering the discriminatory Black Codes of southern states must be used in its interpretation. Primarily written by Representative John Bingham, Section 1 is the most frequently litigated part of the amendment, and this amendment is the most frequently litigated part of the Constitution.

=== Citizenship Clause ===
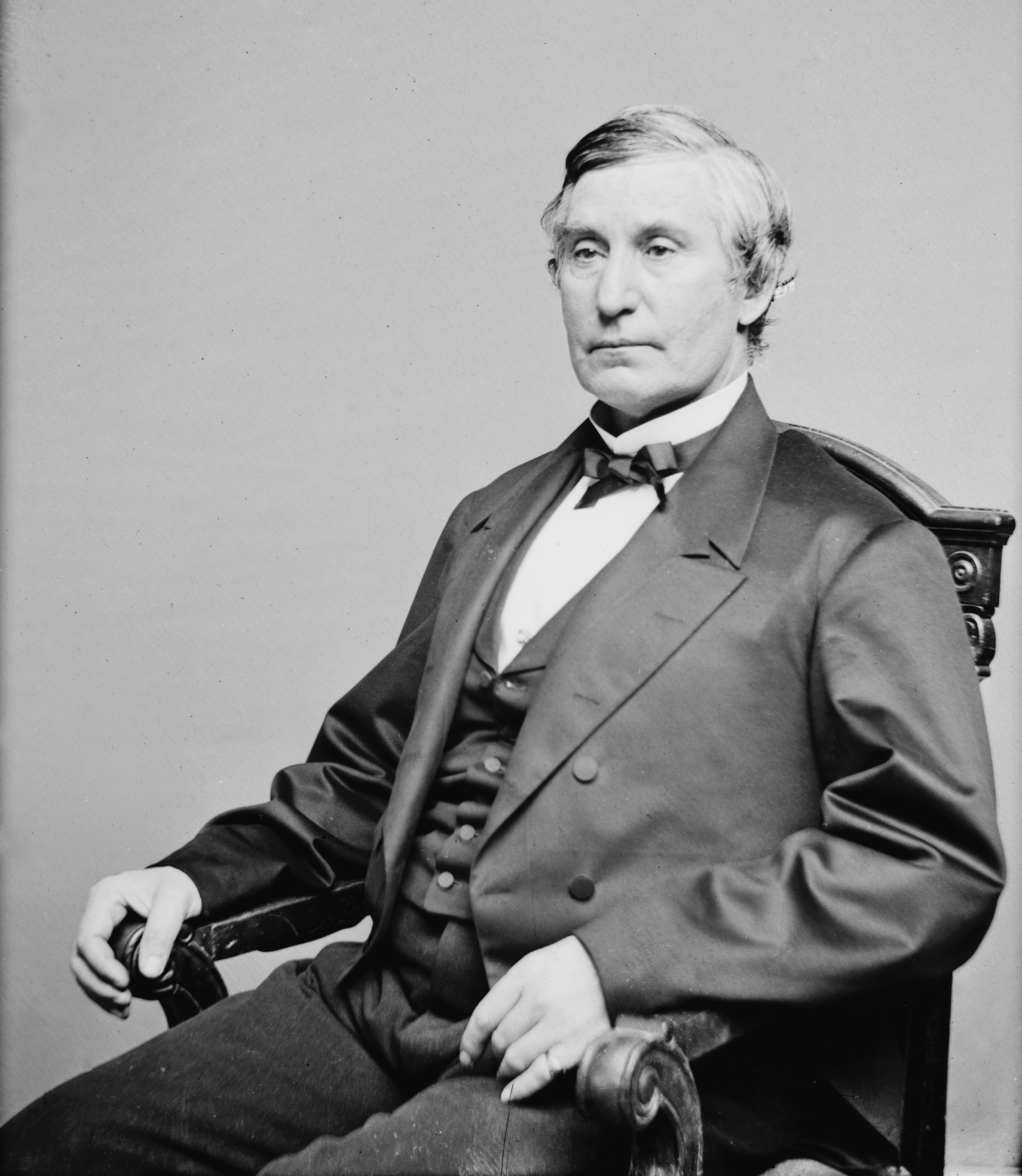
Senator Jacob M. Howard of Michigan, author of the Citizenship Clause

The Citizenship Clause overruled the Supreme Court's Dred Scott decision that African Americans could not become citizens. The clause constitutionalized the Civil Rights Act of 1866's grant of citizenship to all born within the United States, except the children of foreign diplomats. Compared against European jus sanguinis laws that assign citizenship by one's parents, historians have framed the United States' Citizenship Clause as an extension of the Fourteenth Amendment's egalitarian principles.

Congress's debate over the Citizenship Clause shows explicit rejection of Senator Edgar Cowan's anti-Romani sentiment, affirming that birthright citizenship cannot be revoked from children born to disfavored ethnic minorities. Birthright citizenship was meant to repudiate the American Colonization Society's repatriation of freeborn people of color and emancipated slaves to Africa. In United States v. Wong Kim Ark (1898), the Supreme Court confirmed that children born in the United States receive birthright citizenship, regardless of whether their parents are non-citizen immigrants.

In Elk v. Wilkins (1884), the Supreme Court interpreted the Citizenship Clause as granting birthright citizenship to all born within the jurisdiction of the United States and allowing Congress to establish alternative pathways for naturalization. Consistent with the views of the clause's author, Senator Jacob M. Howard, the Supreme Court held that because Indian reservations are not under the federal government's jurisdiction, Native Americans born on such land are not entitled to birthright citizenship. The 1887 Dawes Act offered citizenship to Native Americans who accepted private property as part of cultural assimilation, while the 1924 Indian Citizenship Act offered citizenship to all Native Americans born within the nation's territorial limits.

In Mackenzie v. Hare (1915), the Supreme Court upheld the Expatriation Act of 1907, which dictated that all American women who voluntarily married a foreign alien renounced their American citizenship. Perez v. Brownell (1958) similarly held that Congress could designate voting in foreign elections or draft evasion as renunciations of citizenship. However, in Afroyim v. Rusk (1967) and Vance v. Terrazas (1980), the Supreme Court reversed itself, holding that renunciations of American citizenship must be formally expressed. In Rogers v. Bellei (1971), the Supreme Court distinguished between citizenship conferred by the Fourteenth Amendment and citizenship conferred by Article I, holding that a person who did not acquire citizenship by jus soli or by naturalization, but instead acquired citizenship at birth abroad through jus sanguinis, could later be involuntarily expatriated.

In January 2025, President Donald Trump issued Executive Order 14160 to deny birthright citizenship to children with parents of illegal or temporary immigration status. While this topic was not considered by the 39th Congress, enforcement of the executive order was blocked as unconstitutional by multiple federal judges. Furthermore, many of the freed slaves whose children were covered by the Citizenship Clause were illegal immigrants brought in violation of the 1807 Act Prohibiting Importation of Slaves. The executive order was challenged in court, and the Supreme Court struck down the order on June 30, 2026 in the case Trump v. Barbara.

=== Privileges or Immunities Clause ===
The Privileges or Immunities Clause was written to provide congressional power of enforcement to the similar Privileges and Immunities Clause of Article Four of the Constitution. In 1823, Justice Bushrod Washington decided Corfield v. Coryell, interpreting the latter clause as protecting the right to travel, seek habeas corpus, and hold property in multiple states, among other rights. In the Slaughter-House Cases (1873), the Supreme Court rejected arguments that the Privileges or Immunities Clause further incorporated the Bill of Rights against state governments or transferred police power to the federal government. In McDonald v. City of Chicago (2010) and Timbs v. Indiana (2019), Justice Clarence Thomas advocated moving the incorporation doctrine from substantive due process, which he called a 'legal fiction', to the Privileges or Immunities Clause.

=== Due Process Clause ===
Due process has not been reduced to any formula; its content cannot be determined by reference to any code. The best that can be said is that, through the course of this Court's decisions, it has represented the balance which our Nation, built upon postulates of respect for the liberty of the individual, has struck between that liberty and the demands of organized society. If the supplying of content to this constitutional concept has of necessity been a rational process, it certainly has not been one where judges have felt free to roam where unguided speculation might take them. The balance of which I speak is the balance struck by this country, having regard to what history teaches are the traditions from which it developed as well as the traditions from which it broke. That tradition is a living thing. A decision of this Court which radically departs from it could not long survive, while a decision which builds on what has survived is likely to be sound. No formula could serve as a substitute, in this area, for judgment and restraint.

— Associate Justice John M. Harlan II in his dissenting opinion to Poe v. Ullman 367 U.S. 497 (1961)

The Due Process Clause of the Fourteenth Amendment explicitly applies the Fifth Amendment's similar clause to state governments. This reinforcement of due process rights was in response to the Fugitive Slave Act of 1850 allowing slave owners to recapture their fugitive slaves "without process" and rejecting the testimony of alleged fugitives. In protecting all people against arbitrary denial of life, liberty, or property, courts have recognized both procedural and substantive due process. Procedural due process deals with the processes for restraining life, liberty, or property, such as the right to be notified of a hearing by a neutral decision-maker. In comparison, substantive due process involves the government's justification for engaging in those processes.

In deciding whether legislation unconstitutionally infringes on one's liberty, most government acts are subject to rational basis review, under which the government must present a legitimate state interest and the law must be rationally related to advancing that interest. When the government infringes on fundamental rights, such as racial equality, strict scrutiny requires its actions to instead be narrowly tailored to address a compelling state interest.

The early 20th century has been referred to as the Lochner era for the Supreme Court's embrace of a freedom of contract in cases like Allgeyer v. Louisiana (1897) and Lochner v. New York (1905). While that freedom was ultimately curtailed in West Coast Hotel Co. v. Parrish (1937), those early cases recognized substantive due process rights within the Due Process Clause. For example, Meyer v. Nebraska (1923) and Pierce v. Society of Sisters (1925) struck down anti-immigrant state education laws as violations of substantive due process.

In 1890, future Supreme Court Justice Louis Brandeis and his law partner, Samuel D. Warren II, published "The Right to Privacy" in the Harvard Law Review. While the article only advocated for tort actions to protect one's privacy, the Supreme Court later elevated privacy to a fundamental right, protecting contraceptive sales in Griswold v. Connecticut (1965), consensual sex in Lawrence v. Texas (2003), and same-sex marriage in Obergefell v. Hodges under substantive due process. In Roe v. Wade (1973), the Supreme Court recognized a substantive due process right to abortion, but that holding was overturned in Dobbs v. Jackson Women's Health Organization (2022), which stated that "a right to abortion is not deeply rooted in the Nation's history and traditions."

==== Incorporation of the Bill of Rights ====
Prior to the Fourteenth Amendment, the Supreme Court held in Barron v. Baltimore (1833) that the Bill of Rights only restrained the federal government. However, in Chicago, Burlington & Quincy Railroad Co. v. City of Chicago (1897), the Supreme Court applied the Fifth Amendment's Takings Clause to the eminent domain power of state governments under the Due Process Clause, beginning an ongoing process of incorporation. Legal scholar Akhil Reed Amar has argued that while Congress intended the Fourteenth Amendment to reverse the Barron decision, Representative Bingham expected incorporation to rely on the Privileges or Immunities Clause. The Supreme Court has explicitly rejected incorporation of the Fifth Amendment's Grand Jury Clause and Seventh Amendment, and it has never addressed the Third Amendment.

=== Equal Protection Clause ===
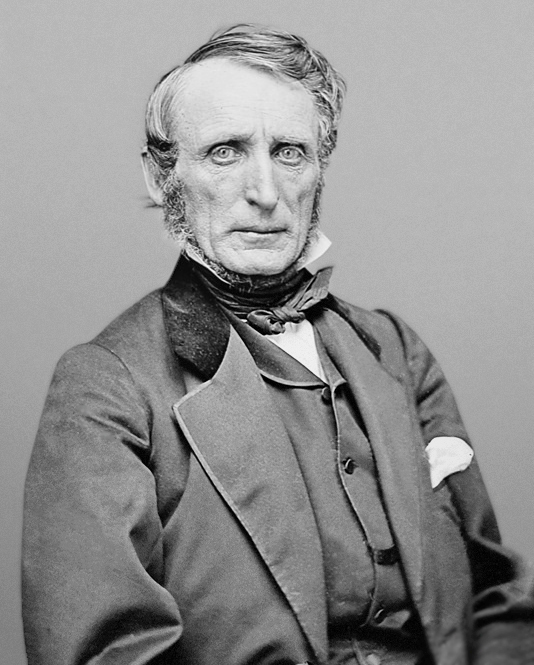
Rep. John Bingham of Ohio was the principal author of the Equal Protection Clause.

The Equal Protection Clause was written to constitutionalize the anti-discrimination principles of the Civil Rights Act of 1866 and prevent enforcement of the southern states' Black Codes. In Strauder v. West Virginia (1880), the Supreme Court recognized exclusion of African Americans from West Virginian juries as an unconstitutional infringement of this clause, triggering the 1866 law's provision to remove the underlying case to federal court. In Yick Wo v. Hopkins (1886), the Supreme Court clarified that race-neutral laws administered in discriminatory ways were similarly unconstitutional.

Whereas the Privileges or Immunities Clause refers to citizens, this clause refers to all people within the jurisdiction of the United States. Accordingly, in Plyler v. Doe (1982), the Supreme Court prohibited state governments from restricting public education on the basis of a child's immigration status. In that decision, Justice William J. Brennan Jr. noted that in Wong Wing v. United States (1896), the Supreme Court had already recognized illegal immigrants as within American jurisdiction for the purposes of due process rights.

While the Fourteenth Amendment's Due Process Clause incorporates the Bill of Rights against state governments, the Fifth Amendment's similar clause has been used for reverse incorporation of the Equal Protection Clause against the federal government. In Bolling v. Sharpe (1954), the Supreme Court used this doctrine to prevent the federal government from maintaining segregated public schools in Washington, D.C.

While states can vary taxation by the taxpayer's profession or form of their property, the Equal Protection Clause restrains the government from engaging in discriminatory tax assessment. Additionally, in Metropolitan Life Insurance Co. v. Ward (1985), the Supreme Court treated the Equal Protection Clause as affirming the Dormant Commerce Clause doctrine against state protectionism. In Santa Clara County v. Southern Pacific Railroad Co. (1886), Supreme Court Reporter of Decisions Bancroft Davis affirmed corporate personhood in the decision's headnote without full discussion by the court. In Minneapolis & St. Louis Railway Co. v. Beckwith (1889), the Supreme Court fully embraced this treatment of businesses as people.

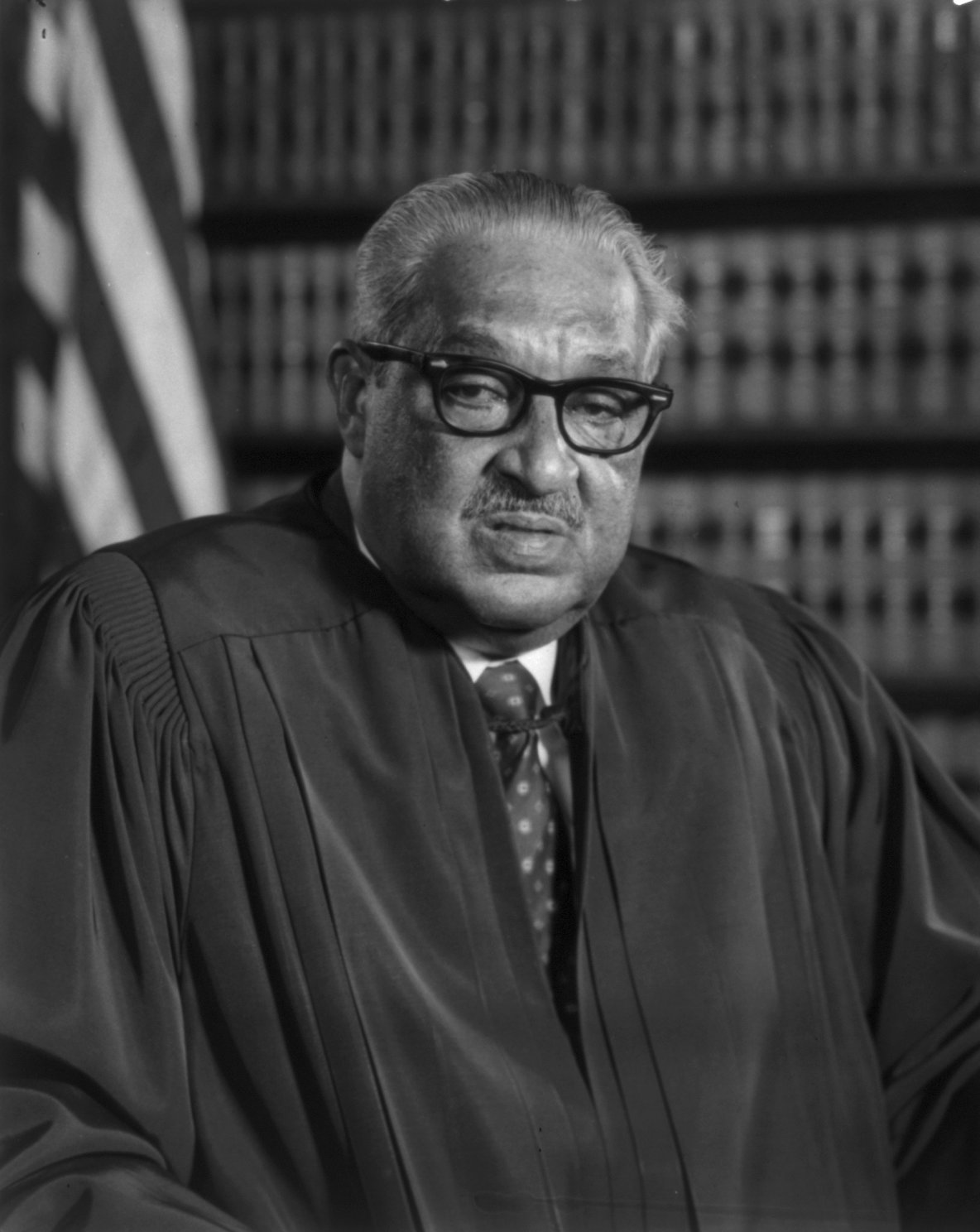
Thurgood Marshall served as chief counsel in the landmark Fourteenth Amendment decision Brown v. Board of Education (1954).

In Plessy v. Ferguson (1896), the Supreme Court held that racial segregation laws did not violate the Equal Protection Clause, and in Cumming v. Richmond County Board of Education (1899), it applied its "separate but equal" doctrine to uphold racial segregation in public schools. Through civil rights litigation, groups like the NAACP weakened this doctrine, culminating in Brown v. Board of Education (1954) holding segregated facilities to be inherently unequal. The ruling was met with "massive resistance" in southern states, leading state and federal courts to overturn many segregationist state laws.

The Supreme Court clarified in Hernandez v. Texas (1954) that the Equal Protection Clause applies to all racial groups. In Reed v. Reed (1971), the Supreme Court unanimously struck down an Idaho probate law favoring men in its first application of the Equal Protection Clause to sex discrimination. Responding to second-wave feminism, the Supreme Court ruled in Craig v. Boren (1976) that sex classifications would thereafter be subjected to intermediate scrutiny.

The Supreme Court ruled in Regents of the University of California v. Bakke (1978) that diverse student bodies were a compelling interest for universities while deeming racial quotas in public university admissions unconstitutional. In the 2003 companion cases Gratz v. Bollinger and Grutter v. Bollinger, the Court continued to accept race-conscious admissions while striking down a points-based system that quantified minority status. In Students for Fair Admissions v. Harvard (2023), the Supreme Court effectively overturned that precedent, declaring affirmative action unconstitutional in private universities that accept federal funds and all public universities except military academies.

With the 1964 cases Wesberry v. Sanders and Reynolds v. Sims, the Supreme Court embraced a "one man, one vote" approach to apportioning congressional districts. While racial gerrymandering was held illegal in Shaw v. Reno (1993), partisan gerrymandering was deemed a political question in Rucho v. Common Cause (2019). In Bush v. Gore (2000), the Supreme Court required states to impose uniform ballot counting procedures across their counties under the Equal Protection Clause. Deeming a complete recount of the 2000 presidential election in Florida impractical, the Supreme Court accepted the Florida Secretary of State's prior vote certification, allowing George W. Bush to win the Electoral College.

=== State actor doctrine ===
The Eleventh Amendment provides state governments with sovereign immunity from federal lawsuits brought by citizens of other states, and in Hans v. Louisiana (1890), the Supreme Court held that it implies immunity from all lawsuits brought by private parties. In Fitzpatrick v. Bitzer (1976), the Supreme Court determined that Section 5 of the Fourteenth Amendment's congressional power of enforcement allows the federal government to limit state sovereign immunity.

Furthermore, in Ex parte Young (1908), the Supreme Court held that private individuals could seek federal injunctions against state officials to prevent enforcement of unconstitutional laws, reasoning that unconstitutional conduct can never be a protected state action. Similarly, in Shelley v. Kraemer (1948), the Supreme Court held that while the federal government cannot prevent private parties from establishing racially discriminatory housing covenants, state and federal courts cannot enforce them.

In cases like Jackson v. Metropolitan Edison Co. (1974) and Flagg Bros., Inc. v. Brooks (1978), the Supreme Court clarified that state laws do not transform regulated businesses into state actors. Thus, private companies are free to engage in conduct that would be unconstitutional for state governments to pursue, though the federal government can prevent discriminatory private conduct under its Commerce Clause authority, and state governments may further regulate business operations.

== Section 2: Apportionment of representatives ==
Section 2. Representatives shall be apportioned among the several States according to their respective numbers, counting the whole number of persons in each State, excluding Indians not taxed. But when the right to vote at any election for the choice of electors for President and Vice President of the United States, Representatives in Congress, the Executive and Judicial officers of a State, or the members of the Legislature thereof, is denied to any of the male inhabitants of such State, being twenty-one years of age, and citizens of the United States, or in any way abridged, except for participation in rebellion, or other crime, the basis of representation therein shall be reduced in the proportion which the number of such male citizens shall bear to the whole number of male citizens twenty-one years of age in such State.

Under the Enumeration Clause of Article I, the size of state delegations to the House of Representatives was apportioned by adding their free populations with three-fifths of their enslaved populations. After the Thirteenth Amendment abolished slavery except as criminal punishment, Congress wrote Section 2 to reduce state representation based on the proportion of their male citizens aged 21 years or older that were denied voting rights. Since only two of the eleven referendums on African American suffrage held in northern states between 1865 and 1869 were successful, Congress assumed that the states would not ratify a nationwide grant of such voting rights. The Senate also rejected a House proposal ordering "that whenever the elective franchise shall be denied or abridged in any State on account of race or color, all persons therein of such race or color shall be excluded from the basis of representation" because it would have permitted race-neutral discrimination.

Southern states ignored this penalty, and Congress declined to enforce it, prompting the 1870 ratification of the Fifteenth Amendment to explicitly prohibit denial of voting rights "on account of race, color, or previous condition of servitude." Legal scholar Gabriel J. Chin has argued this repealed Section 2 to provide self-executing voting rights, but David Froomkin and Eric Eisner rebut that Section 2 still addresses other voting restrictions. For example, it is unsettled whether Section 2 penalizes states for sending delegations to the Electoral College that contravene their election results.

In Saunders v. Wilkins (1945), the Court of Appeals for the Fourth Circuit dismissed whether Virginia's poll tax constituted a restriction of voting rights under Section 2 as a political question, which has been criticized because in 1872, Congress enacted a broad enabling statute under its Section 5 congressional power of enforcement (2 U.S.C. § 6). Interest in enforcing Section 2 further declined after the Voting Rights Act of 1965 prohibited racial discrimination in voting.

In Minor v. Happersett (1875), the Supreme Court rejected voting as among rights protected by the Privileges or Immunities Clause because Section 2 shows that the Fourteenth Amendment only recognizes the voting rights of male citizens aged 21 years or older. Representative James G. Blaine had defeated proposals for Section 2 to base representation on each state's voting population by warning that it would incentivize voting rights for women. Suffragettes condemned Section 2 and secured ratification of the Nineteenth Amendment in 1920 to prohibit sex-based denial of voting rights.

In Richardson v. Ramirez (1974), the Supreme Court upheld the Constitution of California's felony disenfranchisement provisions against an Equal Protection Clause challenge, reasoning that Section 2 allows states to punish crime with a permanent loss of voting rights. However, in Hunter v. Underwood (1985), the Supreme Court held that because a similar provision in the Alabama Constitution of 1901 was enacted with discriminatory intent, it was unenforceable. The 2020 California Proposition 17 restored the right to vote after completion of one's prison term, and as of 2025, half of the states either automatically restore voting rights upon release from prison or never order disenfranchisement.

== Section 3: Disqualification from office for insurrection or rebellion ==
Section 3. No person shall be a Senator or Representative in Congress, or elector of President and Vice President, or hold any office, civil or military, under the United States, or under any State, who, having previously taken an oath, as a member of Congress, or as an officer of the United States, or as a member of any State legislature, or as an executive or judicial officer of any State, to support the Constitution of the United States, shall have engaged in insurrection or rebellion against the same, or given aid or comfort to the enemies thereof. But Congress may, by a vote of two-thirds of each House, remove such disability.

The Insurrection Clause disqualifies candidates for state or federal offices if they previously took an oath to support the Constitution when sworn into a public office but then engaged in insurrection or rebellion against the United States. Prior to the Fourteenth Amendment's adoption, Congress could only disqualify federal officials through impeachment and removal proceedings, as it did for Tennessee District Court Judge West Hughes Humphreys in 1862, and it held no authority over state offices. When Alexander H. Stephens, the former Vice President of the Confederate States of America, was elected to represent Georgia as a Senator in the 39th US Congress, the Republican-dominated Congress blocked him from taking office. To address the process of readmitting Confederate states, Congress established the Joint Committee on Reconstruction, whose work expanded beyond this clause to the overall Fourteenth Amendment.

Using Section 5 of the Fourteenth Amendment's congressional power of enforcement, the Enforcement Act of 1870 authorized federal prosecutors to issue writs of quo warranto to remove those disqualified by the Insurrection Clause from their political offices. In 1942, Congress's revisions of the US Code eliminated that provision. However, a section of the Confiscation Act of 1862 (18 U.S.C. § 2383), which precedes the Fourteenth Amendment, continues to disqualify anyone who "incites, sets on foot, assists, or engages in any rebellion or insurrection against the authority of the United States."

Finding that it had severely underestimated those affected by Section 3, Congress exercised its authority to remove a disqualification with a two-thirds majority in each chamber by passing the Amnesty Act in 1872. This law exempted all Confederates except former Senators, Representatives, federal judges, military officers, cabinet officials, and ambassadors. In 1898, Congress exempted all people then living and disqualified by Section 3, but the Insurrection Clause continues to disqualify those who engage in subsequent insurrection or rebellion. During the 1970s, Congress posthumously lifted the disqualification of Confederate General-in-Chief Robert E. Lee and President Jefferson Davis, both of whom died before the 1898 amnesty.

In the only invocation of Section 3 between Reconstruction and 2021, Congress deemed Victor L. Berger disqualified by his conviction under the Espionage Act of 1917 and refused to seat him for the 66th US Congress. After that conviction was overturned based on judicial bias in Berger v. United States (1921), Berger represented Wisconsin's 5th congressional district for three terms.

After President Donald Trump instigated the January 6 Capitol attack to disrupt the 2021 Electoral College vote count, a group of Colorado voters contested his presidential eligibility under Section 3, seeking to disqualify him from the state's ballots in the 2024 presidential election. In Trump v. Anderson (2024), the Supreme Court held that Section 5 delegates enforcement of the Insurrection Clause to Congress for federal and state officers, while allowing states to also impose disqualification on state candidates. Though the Electoral Count Reform Act of 2022 allows a fifth of members in each chamber of Congress to object to electors whose votes are not "regularly given," which includes constitutional disqualification, no such objections were raised at the 2025 Electoral College vote count.

A similar group of North Carolina voters sued in federal court to disqualify Representative Madison Cawthorn, but he lost the 2022 Republican primary for his district prior to a verdict. After New Mexico state courts removed Otero County commissioner Couy Griffin under Section 3, the Supreme Court declined his appeal, maintaining his disqualification from state and local offices.

== Section 4: Validity of public debt ==
Section 4. The validity of the public debt of the United States, authorized by law, including debts incurred for payment of pensions and bounties for services in suppressing insurrection or rebellion, shall not be questioned. But neither the United States nor any State shall assume or pay any debt or obligation incurred in aid of insurrection or rebellion against the United States, or any claim for the loss or emancipation of any slave; but all such debts, obligations and claims shall be held illegal and void.

Section 4 legitimizes all public debt appropriated by the Congress while rejecting debt associated with emancipation and the Confederacy. In the Gold Clause Cases, the Supreme Court held that Congress's authority over monetary policy allowed it to pass the Emergency Banking Act of 1933, despite the law's practical effect of invalidating gold clauses, which allowed creditors to demand payment in gold. In the 21st century, constitutional law scholars have debated whether Section 4 authorizes the President to unilaterally raise the debt ceiling when Congress is unwilling. In 2011, former President Bill Clinton argued that Section 4 requires the Executive Branch to ignore the debt ceiling in its fulfillment of congressional appropriations.

== Section 5: Power of enforcement ==
Section 5. The Congress shall have power to enforce, by appropriate legislation, the provisions of this article.

In the Slaughter-House Cases, 83 U.S. (16 Wall.) 36 (1873), the Supreme Court opined that Section 5 empowered Congress to enforce the Equal Protection Clause on states that refused to repeal their Black Codes. However, the Civil Rights Cases (1883) held that the Fourteenth Amendment does not empower Congress to outlaw racial discrimination by private individuals. In Heart of Atlanta Motel, Inc. v. United States (1964), the Supreme Court upheld similar legislation under the Commerce Clause instead.

In Katzenbach v. Morgan (1966), the Supreme Court upheld Voting Rights Act of 1965's elimination of literacy tests by claiming that Congress could expand civil rights further than the judiciary. However, City of Boerne v. Flores (1997) rejected application of the Religious Freedom Restoration Act on state governments because it modified rights under the Free Exercise Clause, rather than protecting existing rights.

== Selected Supreme Court cases ==
=== Citizenship ===
- 1884: Elk v. Wilkins
- 1898: United States v. Wong Kim Ark
- 1967: Afroyim v. Rusk
- 1971: Rogers v. Bellei
- 1980: Vance v. Terrazas
- 2026: Trump v. Barbara

=== Privileges or immunities ===
- 1873: Slaughter-House Cases
- 1875: Minor v. Happersett
- 1908: Twining v. New Jersey
- 1920: United States v. Wheeler
- 1948: Oyama v. California
- 1999: Saenz v. Roe

=== Incorporation ===
- 1873: Slaughter-House Cases
- 1883: Civil Rights Cases
- 1884: Hurtado v. California
- 1897: Chicago, Burlington & Quincy Railroad v. Chicago
- 1900: Maxwell v. Dow
- 1908: Twining v. New Jersey
- 1925: Gitlow v. New York
- 1932: Powell v. Alabama
- 1937: Palko v. Connecticut
- 1947: Adamson v. California
- 1947: Everson v. Board of Education
- 1952: Rochin v. California
- 1961: Mapp v. Ohio
- 1962: Robinson v. California
- 1963: Gideon v. Wainwright
- 1964: Malloy v. Hogan
- 1967: Reitman v. Mulkey
- 1968: Duncan v. Louisiana
- 1969: Benton v. Maryland
- 1970: Goldberg v. Kelly
- 1972: Furman v. Georgia
- 1974: Goss v. Lopez
- 1975: O'Connor v. Donaldson
- 1976: Gregg v. Georgia
- 2010: McDonald v. Chicago
- 2019: Timbs v. Indiana
- 2022: New York State Rifle & Pistol Association, Inc. v. Bruen

=== Substantive due process ===
- 1876: Munn v. Illinois
- 1887: Mugler v. Kansas
- 1897: Allgeyer v. Louisiana
- 1905: Lochner v. New York
- 1908: Muller v. Oregon
- 1923: Adkins v. Children's Hospital
- 1923: Meyer v. Nebraska
- 1925: Pierce v. Society of Sisters
- 1934: Nebbia v. New York
- 1937: West Coast Hotel Co. v. Parrish
- 1965: Griswold v. Connecticut
- 1973: Roe v. Wade
- 1977: Moore v. City of East Cleveland
- 1990: Cruzan v. Director, Missouri Department of Health
- 1992: Planned Parenthood v. Casey
- 1996: BMW of North America, Inc. v. Gore
- 1997: Washington v. Glucksberg
- 2003: State Farm v. Campbell
- 2003: Lawrence v. Texas
- 2015: Obergefell v. Hodges
- 2022: Dobbs v. Jackson Women's Health Organization

=== Equal protection ===
- 1880: Strauder v. West Virginia
- 1886: Yick Wo v. Hopkins
- 1886: Santa Clara County v. Southern Pacific Railroad
- 1896: Plessy v. Ferguson
- 1908: Berea College v. Kentucky
- 1916: The People of the State of California v. Jukichi Harada
- 1917: Buchanan v. Warley
- 1942: Skinner v. Oklahoma
- 1948: Shelley v. Kraemer
- 1954: Hernandez v. Texas
- 1954: Brown v. Board of Education
- 1954: Bolling v. Sharpe
- 1962: Baker v. Carr
- 1967: Loving v. Virginia
- 1971: Reed v. Reed
- 1971: Palmer v. Thompson
- 1972: Eisenstadt v. Baird
- 1973: San Antonio Independent School District v. Rodriguez
- 1976: Examining Board v. Flores de Otero
- 1978: Regents of the University of California v. Bakke
- 1982: Plyler v. Doe
- 1982: Mississippi University for Women v. Hogan
- 1986: Posadas de Puerto Rico Associates v. Tourism Company of Puerto Rico
- 1996: United States v. Virginia
- 1996: Romer v. Evans
- 1997: Vacco v. Quill
- 2000: Bush v. Gore
- 2003: Grutter v. Bollinger
- 2023: Students for Fair Admissions v. Harvard
- 2025: United States v. Skrmetti

=== Felon disenfranchisement ===
- 1974: Richardson v. Ramirez
- 1985: Hunter v. Underwood

=== Power of enforcement ===
- 1883: Civil Rights Cases
- 1966: Katzenbach v. Morgan
- 1976: Fitzpatrick v. Bitzer
- 1997: City of Boerne v. Flores
- 1999: Florida Prepaid Postsecondary Education Expense Board v. College Savings Bank
- 2000: United States v. Morrison
- 2000: Kimel v. Florida Board of Regents
- 2001: Board of Trustees of the University of Alabama v. Garrett
- 2003: Nevada Department of Human Resources v. Hibbs
- 2004: Tennessee v. Lane
- 2006: United States v. Georgia
- 2012: Coleman v. Court of Appeals of Maryland
- 2013: Shelby County v. Holder
- 2020: Allen v. Cooper
- 2024: Trump v. Anderson

== Adoption ==
=== Proposal by Congress ===
In the final years of the American Civil War and subsequent Reconstruction era, Congress repeatedly debated the rights of former slaves freed by the 1863 Emancipation Proclamation and the 1865 Thirteenth Amendment, the latter of which formally abolished slavery. Concerned that southern states would use their African American residents to enlarge their congressional representation while infringing on the civil rights of these freedmen, Republicans sought to discourage such disenfranchisement.

The Civil Rights Act of 1866 guaranteed citizenship without regard to race, color, or prior enslavement. The bill also guaranteed equal benefits and access to the law, attacking the discriminatory Black Codes passed by formerly Confederate states to restrict the movement, employment, self-defense, and legal rights of African Americans. Ignoring the urging of moderate Republicans, President Andrew Johnson vetoed the bill on March 27, 1866. In his veto message, Johnson framed the expansion of citizenship to African Americans as racial discrimination for leaving eleven southern states without congressional representation. He further compared that "large numbers of intelligent, worthy, and patriotic foreigners" were forced to wait for naturalization. Three weeks later, Johnson's veto was overridden and the measure became law. Unsure of their constitutional power to pass and enforce the law, especially if Southern Democrats retook Congress, the experience prompted drafting for a constitutional amendment to protect these civil rights.

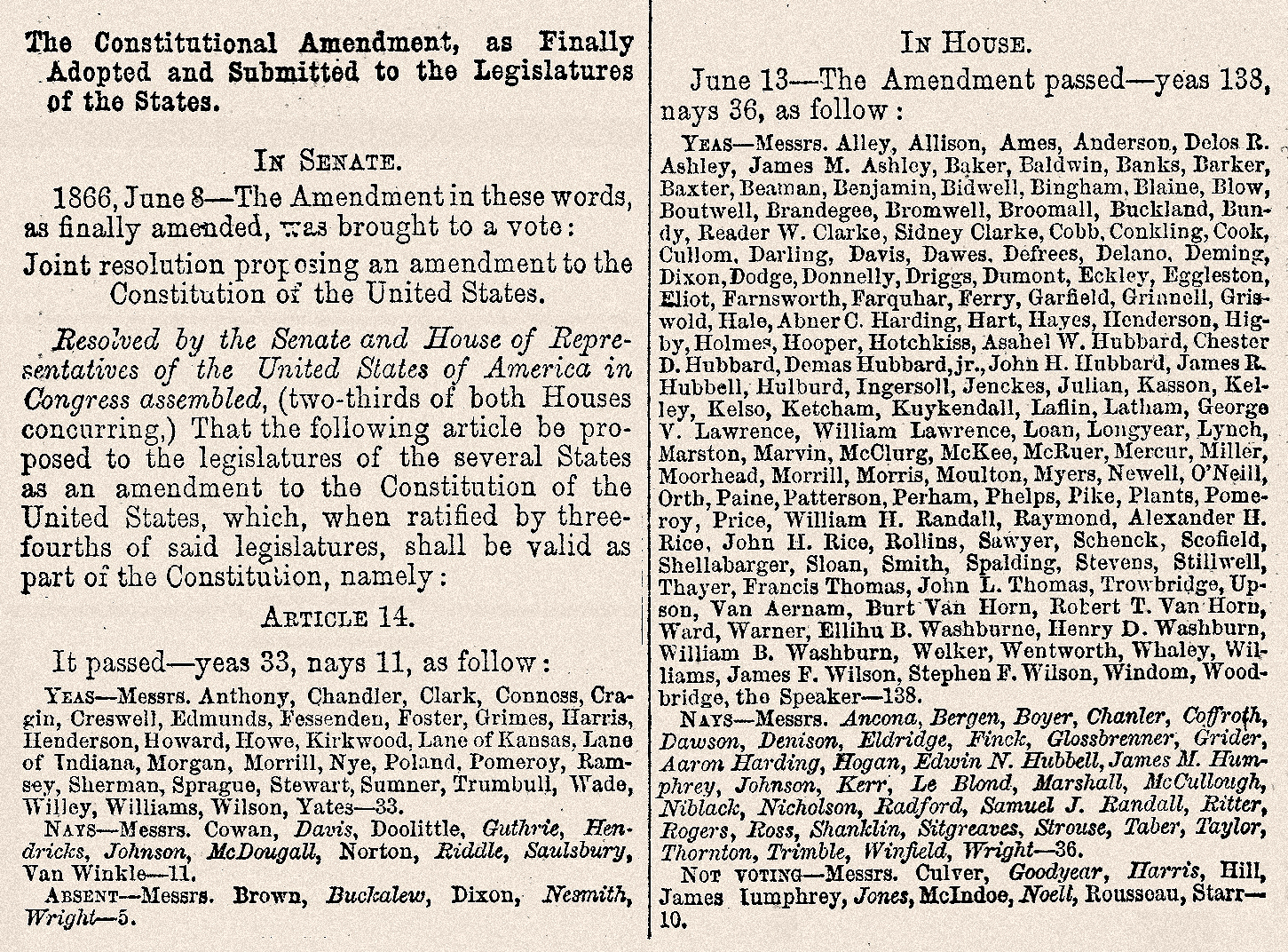
Senate and House votes on the Fourteenth Amendment

More than seventy proposals for an amendment were drafted. In an extensive appendix to his dissenting opinion in Adamson v. California (1947), Justice Hugo Black detailed statements made by "those who framed, advocated, and adopted the Amendment." In late 1865, the Joint Committee on Reconstruction proposed an amendment where states would only receive representation for their citizens with voting rights. This amendment passed the House, but it was blocked in the Senate by a coalition of Radical Republicans led by Charles Sumner, who considered the proposal a "compromise with wrong," and Democrats opposed to black rights. Consideration turned to an amendment by Representative John A. Bingham of Ohio, enabling Congress to safeguard "equal protection of life, liberty, and property" of all citizens, but this proposal failed in the House.

In April 1866, the Joint Committee forwarded a third version to Congress, which combined the prior proposals, rejected Confederate debt, and addressed voting by ex-Confederates. Social reformer Robert Dale Owen led the decision to combine the proposals into the constitution's longest amendment, reasoning that its popular provisions would secure its overall ratification. On May 29, 1866, the House passed this third version as House Resolution 127. The Senate amended Sections 2, 3, and 4, passing the modified version on June 8 by a 33–11 vote (five not voting). The House agreed to the Senate amendments on June 13 by a 138–36 vote (ten not voting). A concurrent resolution requesting the President to transmit the proposal to state governors was passed by both houses of Congress on June 18.

The Radical Republicans lamented that the Fourteenth Amendment only expanded civil rights while leaving political rights unaddressed. Thaddeus Stevens opined, "I find that we shall be obliged to be content with patching up the worst portions of the ancient edifice, and leaving it, in many of its parts, to be swept through by the tempests, the frosts, and the storms of despotism." Abolitionist Wendell Phillips called it a "fatal and total surrender," prompting the Fifteenth Amendment to prohibit government denial of the right to vote "on account of race, color, or previous condition of servitude."

=== Ratification by the states ===
Ratified amendment pre-certification, 1866–1868 Ratified amendment pre-certification after first rejecting it, 1868 Ratified amendment post-certification after first rejecting it, 1869–1976 Ratified amendment post-certification, 1959 Ratified amendment, withdrew ratification (rescission), then re-ratified. Oregon rescinded ratification post-certification and was included in the official count Territories of the United States in 1868, not yet states

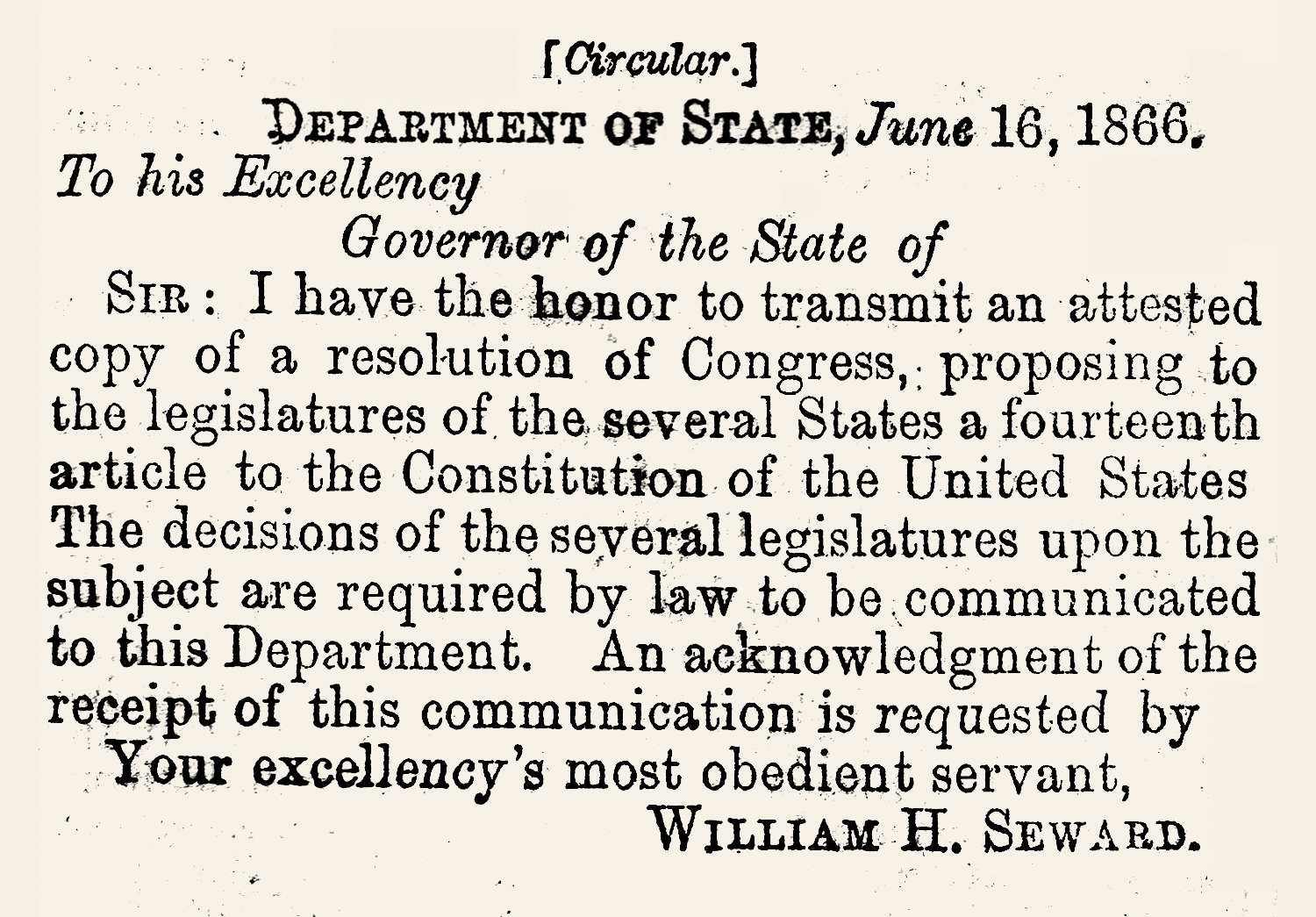
Form of the Letter of Transmittal of the Fourteenth Amendment to the several states for its ratification

On June 16, 1866, Secretary of State William H. Seward transmitted the Fourteenth Amendment to state governors for ratification. After state legislatures in every formerly Confederate state except Tennessee refused to ratify it, Congress passed the Reconstruction Acts, which conditioned readmission on ratification. The first 28 states to ratify the Fourteenth Amendment were:

1. Connecticut: June 30, 1866
2. New Hampshire: July 6, 1866
3. Tennessee: July 19, 1866
4. New Jersey: September 11, 1866 (rescinded ratification February 20, 1868/March 24, 1868; re-ratified April 23, 2003)
5. Oregon: September 19, 1866 (rescinded ratification October 16, 1868; re-ratified April 25, 1973)
6. Vermont: October 30, 1866
7. New York: January 10, 1867
8. Ohio: January 11, 1867 (rescinded ratification January 13, 1868; re-ratified March 12, 2003)
9. Illinois: January 15, 1867
10. West Virginia: January 16, 1867
11. Michigan: January 16, 1867
12. Minnesota: January 16, 1867
13. Kansas: January 17, 1867
14. Maine: January 19, 1867
15. Nevada: January 22, 1867
16. Indiana: January 23, 1867
17. Missouri: January 25, 1867
18. Pennsylvania: February 6, 1867
19. Rhode Island: February 7, 1867
20. Wisconsin: February 13, 1867
21. Massachusetts: March 20, 1867
22. Nebraska: June 15, 1867
23. Iowa: March 16, 1868
24. Arkansas: April 6, 1868
25. Florida: June 9, 1868
26. North Carolina: July 4, 1868 (after rejection December 14, 1866)
27. Louisiana: July 9, 1868 (after rejection February 6, 1867)
28. South Carolina: July 9, 1868 (after rejection December 20, 1866)

After retaking the state legislatures of New Jersey and Ohio, Democrats rescinded their ratifications. On July 20, 1868, Seward certified that if rescissions are invalid, the amendment became law with South Carolina's ratification as the 28th state. The following day, Congress rejected New Jersey's rescission as "scandalous", declaring the Fourteenth Amendment as part of the Constitution and directing Seward to promulgate it as such, establishing that states cannot rescind their ratification, as the resolution was passed by Congress without the inclusion of Georgia:

29. Alabama: July 13, 1868
30. Georgia: July 21, 1868 (after rejection November 9, 1866)

Upon receiving Georgia's ratification on July 27, Seward officially proclaimed the Fourteenth Amendment's adoption, listing all thirty ratifying states to prevent federal courts from recognizing rescission. On October 16, 1868, three months after adoption, Oregon rescinded its ratification, but this had no impact on the Fourteenth Amendment's validity. The Fourteenth Amendment was subsequently ratified by the following states:

31. Virginia: October 8, 1869 (after rejection January 9, 1867)
32. Mississippi: January 17, 1870
33. Texas: February 18, 1870 (after rejection October 27, 1866)
34. Delaware: February 12, 1901 (after rejection February 8, 1867)
35. Maryland: April 4, 1959 (after rejection March 23, 1867)
36. California: May 6, 1959
37. Kentucky: March 30, 1976 (after rejection January 8, 1867)

Since Ohio and New Jersey re-ratified the Fourteenth Amendment in 2003, all states that existed during Reconstruction have ratified the amendment.

=== Proposed revision ===
In response to President Franklin D. Roosevelt's Judicial Procedures Reform Bill of 1937, Senator William Borah proposed a constitutional amendment that would repeal and revise the Fourteenth Amendment, analogous to the 1933 Twenty-First Amendment modifying the Eighteenth Amendment. Borah's amendment would have excluded substantive due process rights, explicitly incorporated the First Amendment against state governments, eliminated the Section 2 penalty for denied voting rights, and omitted Sections 3 and 4. In March 1937, the switch in time that saved nine ended the Lochner era, diminishing interest in either of these judicial reforms.

== See also ==
- Jus soli
- Equality before the law
- United States labor law
