= Examining Board v. Flores de Otero =

- Supreme Court of the United States

Argued December 8, 1975 Decided June 17, 1976
- Full case name: Examining Board of Engineers, Architects and Surveyors et al. v. Flores de Otero
- Citations: 426 U.S. 572 (more) 96 S. Ct. 2264; 49 L. Ed. 2d 65

Holding
- State law that excluded aliens from the practice of civil engineering was declared unconstitutional on the basis of the Equal Protection Clause.

Court membership
- Chief Justice Warren E. Burger Associate Justices William J. Brennan Jr. · Potter Stewart; Byron White · Thurgood Marshall; Harry Blackmun · Lewis F. Powell Jr. William Rehnquist · John P. Stevens

Case opinions
- Majority: Blackmun, joined by Burger, White, Powell, O'Connor, Brennan, Stewart
- Dissent: Rehnquist

Laws applied
- U.S. Const. amend. XIV

Examining Board v. Flores de Otero, 426 U.S. 572 (1976), was a case decided by the Supreme Court of the United States that invalidated a state law that excluded aliens from the practice of civil engineering. The Court invalidated the law on the basis of equal protection using a strict scrutiny standard of review.

== Prior history ==
A Puerto Rico law permits only United States citizens to practice privately as civil engineers. Appellees are alien civil engineers residing in Puerto Rico, one of whom (Flores de Otero) was denied a license under this law, and the other of whom (Perez Nogueiro) was granted only a conditional license to work for the Commonwealth. Each appellee brought suit for declaratory and injunctive relief against appellant Examining Board and its members in the United States District Court for the District of Puerto Rico, claiming jurisdiction under 28 U.S.C. § 1343(3) and alleging that the statute's citizenship requirement violated 42 U.S.C. § 1983.

== See also ==
- List of United States Supreme Court cases, volume 426
