= Jeff Manza =

- Born: Jeff Manza
- Education: University of California, Berkeley (B.A., 1984; M.A., 1989; Ph.D., 1995)
- Known for: Social inequality political sociology
- Scientific career
- Fields: Sociology
- Workplaces: New York University; Northwestern University
- Thesis: Policy experts and political change in the new deal (1995)

Jeff Manza is an American sociologist and professor of sociology at New York University. He is a political sociologist, known for his work on voting behavior, public opinion, and felony disenfranchisement in the United States (with Christopher Uggen). He has also researched the relationship between support for government programs and economic downturns. He created The Sociology Project, a series of introductory sociology textbooks written by himself and NYU colleagues that aim to reorient the presentation of sociological ideas to beginning students.
