= Public criminology =

Academic tendency within criminology

Public criminology is an approach to criminology that disseminates criminological research beyond academia to broader audiences, such as criminal justice practitioners and the general public. Public criminology is closely tied with "public sociology", and draws on a long line of intellectuals engaging in public interventions related to crime and justice. Some forms of public criminology are conducted through methods such as classroom education, academic conferences, public lectures, "news-making criminology", government hearings, newspapers, radio and television broadcasting and press releases. Advocates of public criminology argue that the energies of criminologists should be directed towards "conducting and disseminating research on crime, law, and deviance in dialogue with affected communities." Public criminologists focus on reshaping the image of the criminal and work with communities to find answers to pressing questions. Proponents of public criminology see it as potentially narrowing "the yawning gap between public perceptions and the best available scientific evidence on issues of public concern", a problem they see as especially pertinent to matters of crime and punishment.

The general response to public criminology has been positive, however several authors have voiced a number of concerns: one set of concerns focuses on the ability of public criminologists to effectively impact policy decisions; another set of concerns suggests that initial forays into public criminology have been blind to the political-economic structures that shape Criminal Justice Systems; a third concern centers on the barriers that remain for participating in public criminology.

== Background ==
The first use of the term "public criminology" can be traced to a publication by Eamonn Carrabine, Maggy Lee, and Nigel South. More recent criminologists, building on Michael Burawoy's notion of public sociology, have developed the concept. For example, Uggen and Inderbitzin have expanded the scope of the term by suggesting it should place greater emphasis on work that informs public understandings about issues such as crime, punishment, criminal law, and criminal justice. Their work was in part motivated by the belief that there is a problematically wide gap between criminological research and public opinion and in part by a belief that the approach can inspire a future generation of criminologists to address the problem. In this sense, Uggen and Inderbitizin believe that public criminology can open a dialogue between academic criminologists and the public in a way that can reshape public debates and policy while bringing new perspectives on crime to the table. Ian Loader and Richard Sparks have also expanded Burawoy's ideas regarding public criminology in Public Criminology?, which grounds concerns of public engagement in larger questions about criminology's value to wider society. The Routledge Handbook of Public Criminologies, edited by Kathryn Henne and Rita Shah and published in 2020, offers a more contemporary take on public criminology, addressing the wide range of public criminological practices, scholarly debates, and emergent political challenges.

=== Historical antecedents ===
While the term "public criminology" itself is relatively recent, many scholars acting under that moniker trace their efforts to a longer line of intellectuals engaging in public interventions related to crime and justice. For example Uggen and Inderbitzin find inspiration in the work of Clifford R. Shaw, who studied the relationship between neighborhoods and crime in Chicago starting the 1920s. His research formulated what is now known as Social Disorganization theory, which links crime rates in a neighborhood to other ecological characteristics. In the course of his research he involved residents of the communities in order to both learn from them and communicate his own research findings to them. As a result of this dialogue, Shaw founded the Chicago Area Project which was geared to reduce conditions that resulted in high delinquency.

Uggen and Inderbitzin find similar inspiration in the work of Elliott Currie, a professor of criminology, law and society at the University of California, Irvine who works on policy and specializes in cases of violent crime, the social context of delinquency, etiology of drug abuse and the assessment of drug policy, race and criminal justice, and George Kirkham, a police officer-turned-criminologist who wrote a book entitled "Signal Zero." Overseas, public criminology was institutionalized in at least two locations, the Home Office Research Unit and the Cambridge Institute of Criminology. The first was created by Tom Lodge, an actuarial statistician, and the second was founded by Leon Radzinowicz. Lodge's institution focused on altering the methods of criminology and the way it was taught. Radzinowicz also altered the ideas of criminology. His institution focused on researching problems related to trends in crime, the treatment of offenders, and the reform of substantive criminal law and criminal procedure. In 1964, the Cambridge Institute of Criminology held the first national conference in criminology.

== Criticisms ==
The response to calls for public criminology has generally been positive, though several authors have expressed a number of concerns. One set of concerns has focused on the ability of public criminologists to effectively impact policy decisions. For example, Michael Tonry has pointed out there exists a broad indifference on the part of policy makers to criminological insights, while Daniel Mears illustrates a similar indifference on the part of academic criminology for policy-making issues. Likewise, British Criminologist Paul Rock has voiced concerns regarding criminologist's lack of experience in policy-making, as well as questioning the integrity of public criminology if it is to be subject to the political spectrum. He argues that "...criminology itself often plays so small a role in what is done. It might be far less important that criminologists endorse a measure than that, at the outset, the judiciary, or heads of other government departments, or chiefs of police, and then later, politicians on both sides of the Houses of Parliament do so." Finally, many public criminologists have taken issue with how little criminologists engage in news reporting. For example, Daniel Crépault acknowledges that while criminological news and research is frequently reported, it is often being picked through to serve a partisan agenda and then reported by non-criminologists. In a similar way, anthropologist Sindre Bangstad recognizes social media as an easy way to perform public scholarship, but worries that the soul of academic disciplines who engage will be lost in the vast sea of information.

Another set of concerns suggests that initial forays into public criminology have been blind to the political-economic agenda that shapes the Criminal Justice system. For example, French Sociologist Loïc Wacquant believes that the "public" label of public criminology is nothing more than an American sideshow, hindering debates on crime and justice, confusing professional politics with normal citizen life, and normalizing "law and order" politics on both the Left and Right. Similarly, criminologist Emma Bell takes issue not with public criminology itself, but with the system under which it operates. Believing that in order for public criminology to be effective it must shed light on the problematic criminal justice system itself, she argues that a truly transformative public criminology that offers an 'exit strategy' must "move beyond neoliberalism and to move beyond the punitive penal policies."

A third concern centers on the barriers that remain for participating in public criminology. For example, Christopher Uggen and Michelle Inderbitzin highlight the structural disincentives towards practicing public criminology, starting in initial graduate training. Similarly, Kenneth Land stresses his concern that there are few employment opportunities for public criminology, causing economic barriers for those who might choose to pursue it. Likewise when criminologists Carrie Sanders and Lauren Eisler opened up a college course on criminology to the public, the attendees did not find some of the subject matter engaging. Such problems have led some authors to suggest that the core effort of public criminology should be towards creating inclusive, democratic spaces in which such conversations might take place.

== Contemporary examples ==
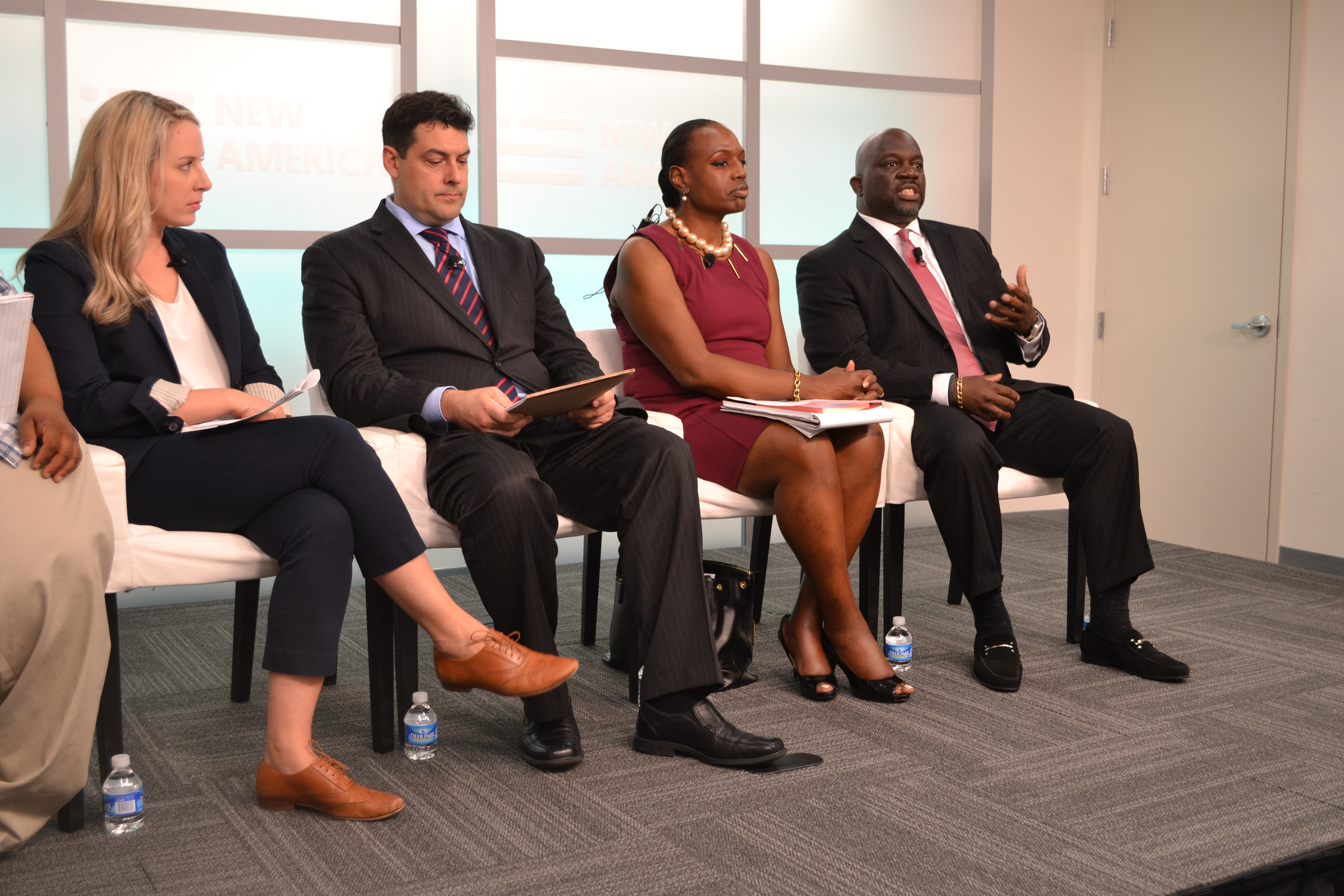
New America's "Who's watching who?" conference brought together police officers, community activists and criminologists.

Beyond the clarion calls to public criminology outlined above, there have been several forays into its actual praxis, with many groups and organizations dedicated to connecting public debates about the criminal justice system to contemporary research in criminology. For example, The Marshall Project was founded in 2014 by Neil Barsky and Bill Keller as a way to "create and sustain a sense of national urgency about the U.S. criminal justice system." Another example is the "Public Criminology" blog on public criminology created by Michelle Inderbitzin, Chris Uggen, and Sara Wakefield, which intends to inform the public on crime, law, and justice in the contemporary United States. In addition, Ian Loader and Richard Sparks provide a sociological evaluation of criminologists and the way they shape their position to fit into social and political controversies to correctly illustrate them for the public to view. They use public criminology to advocate for the rehabilitation of offenders rather than the incarceration of them, prevent crime, and make the justice system so it is more efficient and ethical. Finally, The Center for Public Criminology, which is a segment at the Arizona State University School of Criminology, is dedicated to breaking the veil between the public and those professionals in the criminal justice field. They do this by educating both the public and professionals, while also addressing the stigmas and concerns that each group may have.

A recent example of an individual researcher taking on the task of public criminology is Lisa Martino-Taylor. She is currently professor of Sociology at Southern Illinois University Edwards. In 2017 published "Behind the Fog: How the U.S. Cold War Radiological Weapons Program Exposed Innocent Americans." Her independent research, using the Freedom of Information Act, she uncovered the correspondence and notes from the Manhattan Project scientists. These include the project Director J. Robert Oppenheimer and other scientists, such as Louis Hempelmann, about the specifics of projects being carried out on US Citizens in the name of national defense. Congressional investigations were called in response to the research exposure the cold war secret.

Another example is, Eduardo González-Castillo and Martin Goyette (chapter 10) provide a critical analysis of community interventions among young people in Montreal using a Gramscian analysis. On the basis of ethnographic interviews and observations carried out in the borough of Montréal-Nord, the authors describe a heterogeneous milieu of interventions and document the ways in which various civil society actors contribute to state control mechanisms through paradoxical community interventions, which aim to be helpful but are nonetheless stigmatizing.

== See also ==
- Criminology
- Public sociology
- Michael Burawoy
- Critical criminology
