= Richardson v. Ramirez =

- Supreme Court of the United States

Argued January 15, 1974 Decided June 24, 1974
- Full case name: Viola N. Richardson v. Abran Ramirez et al.
- Citations: 418 U.S. 24 (more) 94 S. Ct. 2655, 41 L. Ed. 2d 551; 1974 U.S. LEXIS 84

Case history
- Prior: Ramirez v. Brown, 9 Cal.3d 199 (1973). Appeal from the Supreme Court of California
- Subsequent: Ramirez v. Brown, 12 Cal. 3d 912 (Cal. 1974)

Holding
- Disenfranchising convicted felons beyond their sentence and parole does not violate the Equal Protection Clause of the 14th Amendment.

Court membership
- Chief Justice Warren E. Burger Associate Justices William O. Douglas · William J. Brennan Jr. Potter Stewart · Byron White; Thurgood Marshall · Harry Blackmun; Lewis F. Powell Jr. · William Rehnquist

Case opinions
- Majority: Rehnquist, joined by Burger, Stewart, White, Blackmun, Powell
- Dissent: Marshall, joined by Brennan; Douglas (Part I–A)

Laws applied
- U.S. Const. amend. XIV

Richardson v. Ramirez, 418 U.S. 24 (1974), is a landmark decision by the Supreme Court of the United States in which the Court held, 6–3, that convicted felons could be barred from voting beyond their sentence and parole without violating the Equal Protection Clause of the Fourteenth Amendment to the Constitution. Such felony disenfranchisement is practiced in a number of states.

== Background ==
In May 1972, Abran Ramirez, who had previously been convicted of a felony, was refused voter registration by a county clerk in San Luis Obispo County, California, on grounds that he had one or more felonies on his criminal record. Joining with other plaintiffs who had also been denied registration for similar reasons, Ramirez brought a class-action lawsuit against Jerry Brown, who at the time was California's Secretary of State, challenging a state constitutional provision that permanently disenfranchised anyone convicted of an "infamous crime", unless the right to vote was restored by court order or executive pardon.

Typically in voting rights cases, states must show that the voting restriction is necessary to a "compelling state interest," and is the least restrictive means of achieving the state's objective. In this case, the plaintiffs argued that the state had no compelling interest to justify denying them the right to vote. The California Supreme Court agreed that the law was unconstitutional. On appeal, however, the U.S. Supreme Court said that a state does not have to prove that its felony disenfranchisement laws serve a compelling state interest.

== Opinion of the Court ==
Oral arguments were held on January 15, 1974. George J. Roth argued on behalf of the state of California, and Martin R. Glick argued on behalf of the petitioners.

The Supreme Court ruled 6–3 that California's law was constitutional. The majority opinion was written by Justice William Rehnquist.

The Court relied on Section 2 of the Fourteenth Amendment to the U.S. Constitution, which calls for reducing representation in the U.S. House of Representatives for any state that denies the right to vote to its voters (a provision designed to prevent the Southern states from disenfranchising black citizens after the Civil War). But Section 2 makes an exception for denying voting rights to citizens because of "participation in rebellion, or other crimes." The Court said that this distinguishes felony disenfranchisement from other forms of voting restrictions, which must be narrowly tailored to serve compelling state interests in order to be constitutional.

The Court also reviewed the legislative history of Section 2, and relied as well on the fact that when the Fourteenth Amendment was adopted in 1868, over half of the U.S. states allowed denying the right to vote to "persons convicted of felonies or infamous crimes."

The plaintiffs also raised a separate claim that the application of law violated equal protection, and as the California Supreme Court never considered it, the Court remanded the case back to the state for further consideration.

== Aftermath ==
Before the case could be reconsidered by the California Supreme Court, voters passed Proposition 10 in November 1974 to only disenfranchise people while they are imprisoned or on parole.

== See also ==
- Hunter v. Underwood, 471 U.S. 222 (1985)
- Lists of United States Supreme Court cases
  - Lists of United States Supreme Court cases by volume
  - List of United States Supreme Court cases, volume 418
