= Paul Rock (criminologist) =

British criminologist

Paul Rock is a British sociologist and criminologist. He is a Professor of Social Institutions at the London School of Economics.

Rock was a founding member of the National Deviancy Conference. He has contributed to the field of public criminology.

== See also ==
- Crime in England

== Publications ==
- Rock, P. ed. (1988), A History of British Criminology, Oxford: Oxford University Press
- Rock, P. ed. (1994) The History of Criminology, Aldershot: Dartmouth
- Downes, D. & Rock, P. (2003) Understanding Deviance. 4th ed. Oxford: Oxford University Press
- Rock, Paul. 2010. "Comment on 'Public Criminologies.'" Criminology & Public Policy 9 (4): 751–767. doi:10.1111/j.1745-9133.2010.00667.x.
