= Hunter v. Underwood =

- Supreme Court of the United States

Argued February 26, 1985 Decided April 16, 1985
- Full case name: Hunter, et al. v. Victor Underwood, et al.
- Citations: 471 U.S. 222 (more) 105 S. Ct. 1916; 85 L. Ed. 2d 222; 1985 U.S. LEXIS 2740; 53 U.S.L.W. 4468

Holding
- Even if racially neutral in text, a law enacted with the intent to disenfranchise a particular group of persons is inherently unequal.

Court membership
- Chief Justice Warren E. Burger Associate Justices William J. Brennan Jr. · Byron White; Thurgood Marshall · Harry Blackmun; Lewis F. Powell Jr. · William Rehnquist; John P. Stevens · Sandra Day O'Connor

Case opinion
- Majority: Rehnquist, joined by Burger, Brennan, White, Marshall, Blackmun, Stevens, O'Connor
- Powell took no part in the consideration or decision of the case.

Laws applied
- U.S. Const. amend. XIV; Art. VIII, § 182 of the Alabama Constitution of 1901

Hunter v. Underwood, 471 U.S. 222 (1985), was a case in which the Supreme Court of the United States unanimously invalidated the criminal disenfranchisement provision of § 182 of the Alabama Constitution as a violation of the Equal Protection Clause of the Fourteenth Amendment to the U.S. Constitution.

== Background ==
Carmen Edwards, an African-American, and Victor Underwood, a white man, had been convicted for the misdemeanor of presenting a worthless check. They were blocked from voting. Their disenfranchisement was mandated by § 182 of the Alabama Constitution, which disenfranchised persons convicted of "any crime ... involving moral turpitude." This part of Alabama's constitution was worked out at a constitutional convention in 1901, and afterwards adopted by a popular referendum. The new provisions in the constitution included a long list of both felonies and misdemeanors which should lead to disenfranchisement, together with the general provision in §182. In applying this generic paragraph, the Alabama Board of Registrars consulted precedents in the Alabama state court decisions, or asked the Alabama State Attorney for an opinion.

Edwards and Underwood contended that the registrar's decision to deny them suffrage violated the Equal Protection Clause of the Fourteenth Amendment of the U.S. Constitution, since the purpose and effect of this rule was directed against Afro-American suffrage.

== Lower court decisions ==
Edwards and Underwood sued the Board of Registrars at a Federal District Court. The District Court found that indeed the outspoken purpose of the constitutional change was "the disenfranchisement of blacks". However, the court could not find it proven that this particular provision was based on racism, and decided against the plaintiffs.

Edwards and Underwood appealed to the 11th Circuit Court of Appeals, which reversed the decision in their favor. The Court of Appeals held that when the discriminatory purpose had been firmly established, as in this case, the burden was on the defendants to prove that, without this discriminatory purpose, the outcome would have been the same. In the court's opinion, the registrar representatives had failed to do this.

The Alabama Board of Registrars, in turn, appealed to the Supreme Court.

== Opinion of the Court ==
The Supreme Court upheld the decision of the Court of Appeal, and thus struck down the provision as a violation of the Equal Protection Clause.

The Court identified § 182 as a facially neutral law with racially disproportionate effects, thus requiring an inquiry to discover if the law was passed with a discriminatory purpose. The provision was adopted at a convention in 1901, and the Court found ample evidence that the law and other measures of the convention were passed with the outspoken intention of disenfranchising practically all African-Americans, from its very start. At the opening address, the chairman of the convention claimed that its purpose was, "within the limits imposed by the Federal Constitution, to establish white supremacy in this State". This was supported by the minutiae of the proceedings, where delegates repeatedly claim that they did not wish to disenfranchise "whites", but "blacks".

The appellants claimed that this openly acknowledged purpose was accompanied by an unspoken purpose of disenfranchising "poor whites". They claimed their true object was for the ruling party, the Southern Democrats, to thwart the Populists and the Republicans, who threatened their political power, by disenfranchising groups of voters who were more inclined to vote for those parties. However, since they needed the "white votes" to bring through these measures directed against a tangible part of the "white electorate", the convention could not openly explain their true purpose. Instead, they exaggerated the purpose of disenfranchising Afro-Americans.

The appellants argued then that the disenfranchisement rules were not unconstitutional since the secret, yet ultimate, purpose was to secure the rule of the Southern Democrats by disenfranchising a sufficient number of their opponents' supporters, independent of their race. They claimed that rewriting the laws for such a purpose was not prohibited by the Fourteenth Amendment.

The Supreme Court did not comment on the constitutionality of the purpose that the appellants claimed that the constitutional reform had. Instead, the court noted that the enumerated misdemeanors in the constitution had been chosen with some care, so that they covered many lesser offenses for which mainly black people were convicted, such as petty larceny, while omitting what the court judged to be more serious offenses such as "second-degree manslaughter, assault on a police officer, mailing pornography, and aiding the escape of a misdemeanant". In the Court's opinion, this established discrimination against Afro-Americans as a major purpose of the constitutional reform (both in words and deeds). Therefore, whether or not there also was a secondary purpose, as outlined by the appellants, would be irrelevant.

== See also ==
- List of United States Supreme Court cases, volume 471
- Richardson v. Ramirez (1974) Original decision allowing disfranchisement of felons.
