= Christopher Uggen =

American criminologist and sociologist

- Born: c. 1964 (age 61–62)
- Education: University of Wisconsin–Madison
- Scientific career
- Fields: Sociology
- Workplaces: University of Minnesota
- Thesis: Choice, Commitment, and Opportunity: An Event History Analysis of Supported Employment and Crime (1995)
- Doctoral advisor: Ross Matsueda
- Website: www.soc.umn.edu/~uggen/

Christopher J. Uggen (born c. 1964) is a Regents professor and Distinguished McKnight Professor of sociology and law at the University of Minnesota, where he also holds the Martindale Chair in Sociology. Uggen is best known for his work on public criminology, desistance from crime and the life course, crime in the workplace, sexual harassment, and the effects of mass incarceration, including Felon disenfranchisement, reentry, recidivism, and inequality.

== Background and early education ==
Uggen attended the University of Wisconsin–Madison for undergraduate and graduate school, earning his PhD in 1995.

== Career ==
Uggen began his studies at University of Minnesota in 1995, and was chair of the University of Minnesota sociology department from 2006 to 2012. Uggen gained recognition in the early 2000s for his research on work opportunities and recidivism. He went on to author a 2003 American Sociological Review article with sociologist Jeff Manza, "Democratic Contraction: Political Consequences of Felon Disenfranchisement in the United States," which gained significant attention after finding that the 2000 United States presidential election could have gone to Al Gore if felons were not disenfranchised. Uggen and Manza went on to author "Locked Out: Felon Disenfranchisement and American Democracy." They found that US ex-felons who voted in the 1996 US election were much less likely to have committed crimes in the four years following the election.

Uggen's research on workplace authority and sexual harassment, incarceration and health, race in the United States criminal justice system, employer discrimination against felons, and other collateral consequences of criminal conviction have been influential both in and out of the sociology discipline.

Uggen was expected to assume the office of vice president of the American Sociological Association in August 2017, and has received the 2016 SUNY Albany Hindelang Speaker Award for career contributions to criminology.
