= 1940 United States Senate election in Montana =

- November 5, 1940
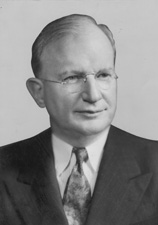

Nominee	Burton K. Wheeler	E. K. Cheadle
Party	Democratic	Republican
Popular vote	176,753	63,941
Percentage	73.43%	26.57%
- County results Wheeler: 50–60% 60–70% 70–80% 80–90% 90–100%
U.S. senator before election
Burton K. Wheeler
Democratic
Elected U.S. Senator
Burton K. Wheeler
Democratic

The 1940 United States Senate election in Montana took place on November 5, 1940. Incumbent United States Senator Burton K. Wheeler, who was first elected to the Senate in 1922, and was re-elected in 1928 and 1934, ran for re-election. Though he faced a serious challenger in the Democratic primary, he emerged victorious, and advanced to the general election, where he faced E. K. Cheadle, a state district judge and the Republican nominee. Just like in 1934, Wheeler won re-election in a landslide, winning his fourth term in the Senate.

== Democratic primary ==
=== Candidates ===
- Burton K. Wheeler, incumbent United States Senator
- H. J. Freebourn, Attorney General of Montana

=== Results ===
Democratic Party primary results
Party	Candidate	Votes	%
Democratic	Burton K. Wheeler (incumbent)	75,498	72.86
Democratic	H. J. Freebourn	28,128	27.14
Total votes		103,626	100.00

== Republican primary ==
=== Candidates ===
- E. K. Cheadle, Tenth Judicial Circuit District Judge
- L. Ray Carroll, former State Senator
- Floyd C. Fluent

=== Results ===
Republican Primary results
Party	Candidate	Votes	%
Republican	H. K. Cheadle	22,273	52.13
Republican	L. Ray Carroll	13,483	31.56
Republican	Floyd C. Fluent	6,972	16.32
Total votes		42,728	100.00

== General election ==
=== Results ===
United States Senate election in Montana, 1940
Party	Candidate	Votes	%	±%
Democratic	Burton K. Wheeler (incumbent)	176,753	73.43%	+3.29%
Republican	E. K. Cheadle	63,941	26.57%	−2.17%
Majority		112,812	46.87%	+5.47%
Turnout		240,694		
Democratic hold		Swing		
