= National Register of Historic Places listings in Silver Bow County, Montana =

Location of Silver Bow County in Montana

This is a list of the National Register of Historic Places listings in Silver Bow County, Montana. It is intended to be a complete list of the properties and districts on the National Register of Historic Places in Silver Bow County, Montana, United States. The locations of National Register properties and districts for which the latitude and longitude coordinates are included below, may be seen in a map.

There are 23 properties and districts listed on the National Register in the county, including 2 National Historic Landmarks.

This National Park Service list is complete through NPS recent listings posted April 24, 2026.

== Listings county-wide ==
	Name on the Register	Image	Date listed	Location	City or town	Description
1	Basin Creek Park Historic District		November 27, 2023 (#100009566)	Approximately 9 miles (14 km) south of Butte on Basin Creek Rd. (393); 45°51′22″N 112°32′45″W	Butte vicinity	
2	Big Hole Pumpstation	Big Hole Pumpstation	September 24, 1980 (#80002432)	Montana Highway 43; 45°45′50″N 112°47′14″W	Butte	
3	Butte, Anaconda and Pacific Railway Historic District	Butte, Anaconda and Pacific Railway Historic District	October 13, 1988 (#88001111)	Right-of-way begins in Butte and travels to Anaconda, generally along the course of Silver Bow Creek; also the confluence of German Gulch and Silver Bow Creeks at the eastern end of Silver Bow Canyon; 46°02′37″N 112°44′25″W	Butte	Extends into Deer Lodge County. Location at the confluence represents a boundary increase, added on January 13, 1989
4	Butte-Anaconda Historic District	Butte-Anaconda Historic District	October 15, 1966 (#66000438)	Most of the developed areas of Anaconda, Butte, and Walkerville; 46°00′55″N 112°32′10″W	Butte and Walkerville	Extends into Deer Lodge County
5	Castle Rock Lodge		January 28, 2025 (#100011341)	665 Little Basin Creek Rd; 45°53′43″N 112°34′45″W	Butte	
6	Charles W. Clark Mansion	Charles W. Clark Mansion	October 22, 1976 (#76001128)	108 N. Washington St. 46°00′49″N 112°32′28″W	Butte	
7	W. A. Clark Mansion	W. A. Clark Mansion	October 6, 1970 (#70000366)	219 W. Granite; 46°00′52″N 112°32′21″W	Butte	
8	Harding Way Historic District		April 8, 2024 (#100010219)	Montana Highway 2, MP 75.0 to Milepost 80.1; 45°52′00″N 112°27′04″W	Butte vicinity	
9	Hawthorne Grade School	Hawthorne Grade School	January 25, 1988 (#87002304)	3500 White Way; 45°58′28″N 112°29′16″W	Butte	
10	Homestake Airway Beacon		May 31, 2019 (#100004037)	Along Continental Divide at Homestake Pass in Beaverhead-Deerlodge National Forest; 45°55′11″N 112°25′00″W	Butte vicinity	Extends into Jefferson County.
11	Longfellow Grade School		January 25, 1988 (#87002305)	1629 Roosevelt Ave. 45°58′47″N 112°30′54″W	Butte	Demolished in 2007
12	Madison Grade School	Madison Grade School	January 25, 1988 (#87002306)	45 E. Greenwood; 45°59′24″N 112°32′06″W	Butte	
13	Matt's Place Drive-In	Matt's Place Drive-In	March 29, 2001 (#01000308)	2339 Placer St. 45°59′30″N 112°32′18″W	Butte	
14	Parrot Mine Shops Complex	Parrot Mine Shops Complex	January 9, 2007 (#06001228)	244 Anaconda Rd. 46°01′01″N 112°31′41″W	Butte	
15	Ramsay Historic District	Ramsay Historic District	January 14, 1988 (#87002227)	6.5 miles west of Butte on Interstate 90; 46°00′20″N 112°41′09″W	Butte	
16	Shaffer's Chapel African Methodist Episcopal Church	Shaffer's Chapel African Methodist Episcopal Church	December 3, 2018 (#100003199)	602 S Idaho; 46°00′24″N 112°32′25″W	Butte	
17	Silver Bow Airway Beacon		May 25, 2019 (#100004023)	Approximately 3 miles northwest of Ramsay; 46°03′06″N 112°42′45″W	Ramsay vicinity	
18	Silver Bow Brewery Malt House	Silver Bow Brewery Malt House	January 19, 1983 (#83001076)	West of Butte off U.S. Route 91; 46°00′22″N 112°38′35″W	Butte	
19	Silver Bow County Poor Farm Hospital	Silver Bow County Poor Farm Hospital	July 16, 1981 (#81000366)	3040 Continental Dr. 45°59′04″N 112°29′09″W	Butte	
20	Socialist Hall	Socialist Hall	May 26, 1995 (#95000661)	1957 Harrison Ave. 45°59′39″N 112°30′45″W	Butte	
21	U.S. Post Office	U.S. Post Office	November 15, 1979 (#79001426)	400 N. Main St; 46°00′52″N 112°32′19″W	Butte	
22	Burton K. Wheeler House	Burton K. Wheeler House	December 8, 1976 (#76001129)	1232 E. 2nd St. 46°00′20″N 112°31′13″W	Butte	
23	Wold Barn		January 8, 2009 (#08001287)	Southwestern corner of the junction of Hecla and 3rd Sts. 45°37′50″N 112°41′14″W	Melrose	Barn from 1906.

== See also ==
- List of National Historic Landmarks in Montana
- National Register of Historic Places listings in Montana
