= 1934 United States Senate election in Montana =

- November 6, 1934
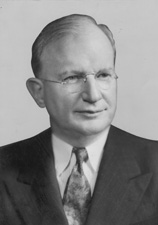

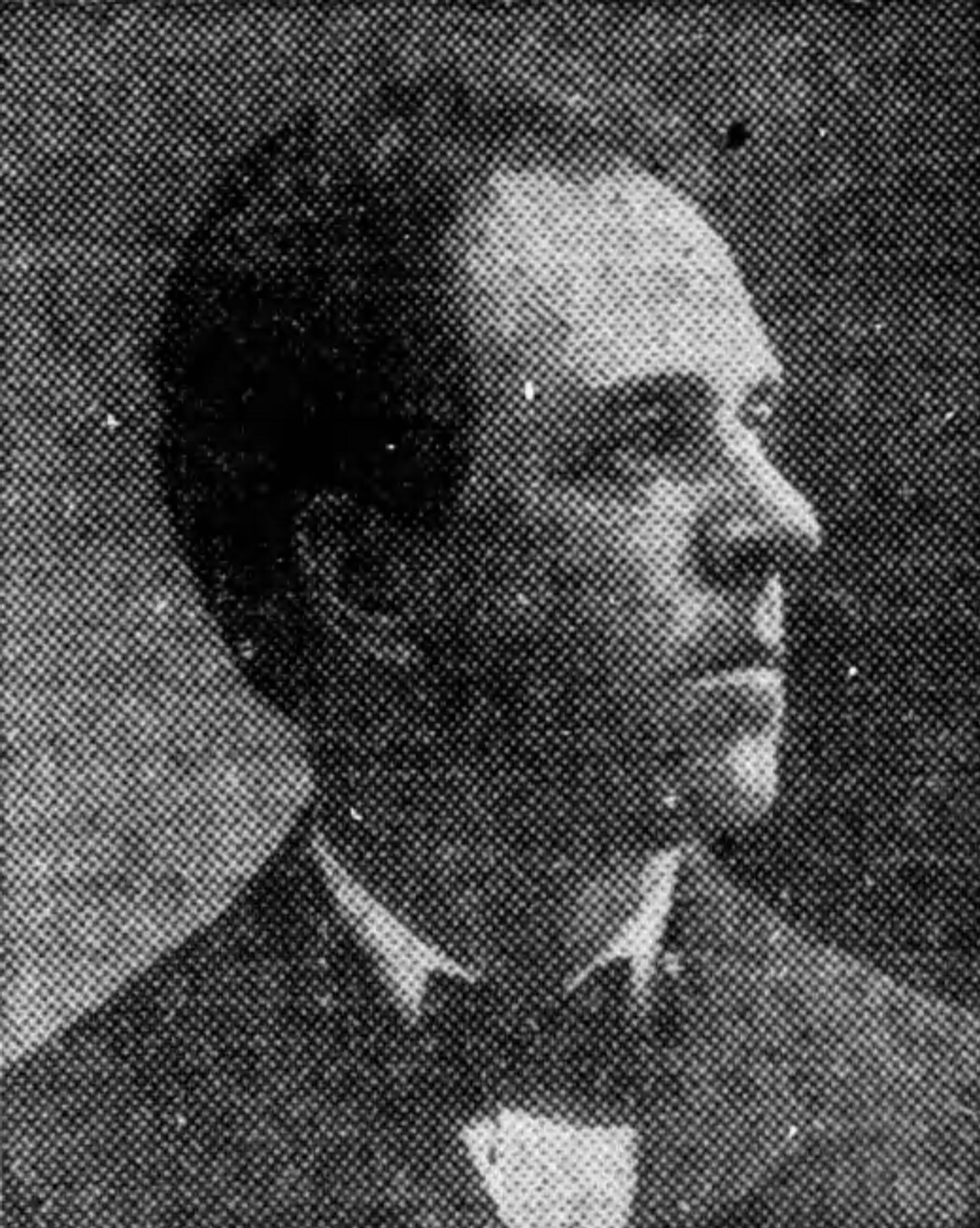
Nominee	Burton K. Wheeler	George Bourquin
Party	Democratic	Republican
Popular vote	142,823	58,519
Percentage	70.14%	28.74%
- County results Wheeler: 50–60% 60–70% 70–80% 80–90% No data
U.S. senator before election
Burton K. Wheeler
Democratic
Elected U.S. senator
Burton K. Wheeler
Democratic

The 1934 United States Senate election in Montana took place on November 6, 1934. Incumbent United States Senator Burton K. Wheeler, who was first elected to the Senate in 1922, and was re-elected in 1928, ran for re-election. After easily winning the Democratic primary, Wheeler moved on to the general election, where he faced George M. Bourquin, a former United States Federal Judge and the Republican nominee. In a stark contrast to his close campaign in 1928, Wheeler won re-election to his third Senate term in a landslide.

== Democratic primary ==
=== Candidates ===
- Burton K. Wheeler, incumbent United States Senator
- Bert Replogle, attorney

=== Results ===
Democratic Party primary results
Party	Candidate	Votes	%
Democratic	Burton K. Wheeler (inc.)	72,775	89.53
Democratic	Bert Replogle	8,513	10.47
Total votes		81,288	100.00

== Republican primary ==
=== Candidates ===
- George M. Bourquin, former United States Federal Judge of the United States District Court for the District of Montana
- O. H. P. Shelley

=== Results ===
Republican Primary results
Party	Candidate	Votes	%
Republican	George M. Bourquin	36,152	70.39
Republican	O. H. P. Shelley	15,209	29.61
Total votes		51,361	100.00

== General election ==
=== Results ===
United States Senate election in Montana, 1934
Party	Candidate	Votes	%	±%
Democratic	Burton K. Wheeler (inc.)	142,823	70.14%	+16.94%
Republican	George M. Bourquin	58,519	28.74%	−18.06%
Socialist	William F. Held	1,381	0.68%	
Communist	Raymond F. Gray	903	0.44%	
Majority		84,304	41.40%	+35.00%
Turnout		203,626		
Democratic hold		Swing		
