= Salones Islámicos del Colegio de Doncellas =

The Salones Islámicos del Colegio de Doncellas are Islamic halls located inside the Colegio de Doncellas in the city of Toledo, in Castile-La Mancha, Spain. The house with the two halls has one entrance, through the Shed of the Colegio de Doncellas number 2, with access to the main courtyard.

The house has been subject to many modifications, maintaining the Islamic design even though many new features and areas have been added during the later centuries. Three phases are articulated around a main hall, of Islamic origin, from which the old residents used to expand and consolidate a new dwelling that will have its maximum splendor in the late Middle Ages. It is from this moment on that the building stops to undergo changes until reforms in the 18th and 19th centuries.
