= Flower Garden of Isfahan =

Green space in Isfahan, Iran

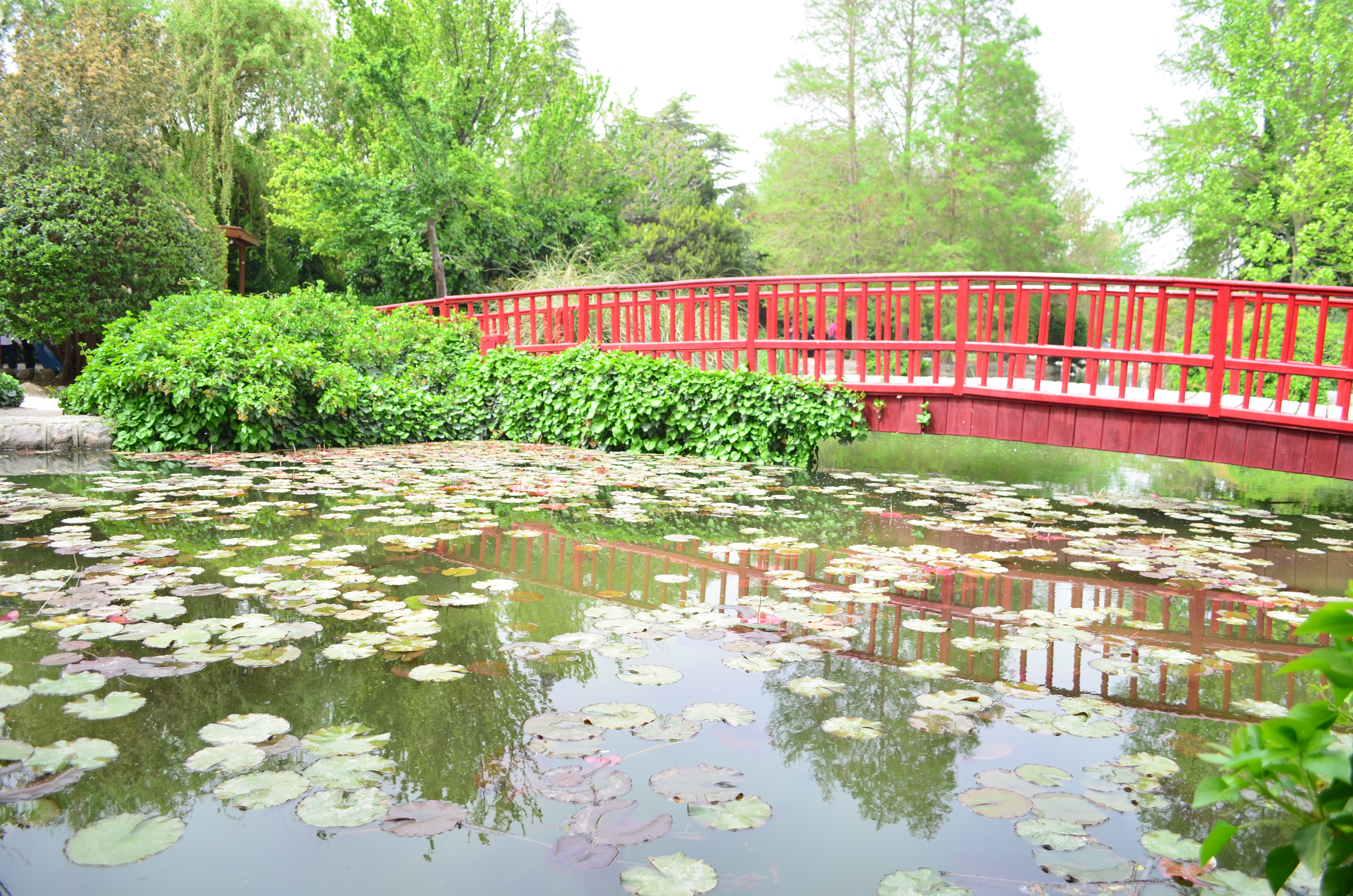
- Interactive map of Flower Garden of Isfahan
- Type: Urban park
- Location: Isfahan, Iran
- Coordinates: 32°38′21″N 51°41′55″E
- Owner: Municipality of Isfahan
- Status: Open

The Flower garden of Isfahan (Persian: باغ گل‌های اصفهان) was a major green space project completed in the 1990s in Isfahan, Iran. Serving multiple purposes, the garden is a recreational, cultural, educational and research center. Its buildings incorporate traditional Iranian elements.

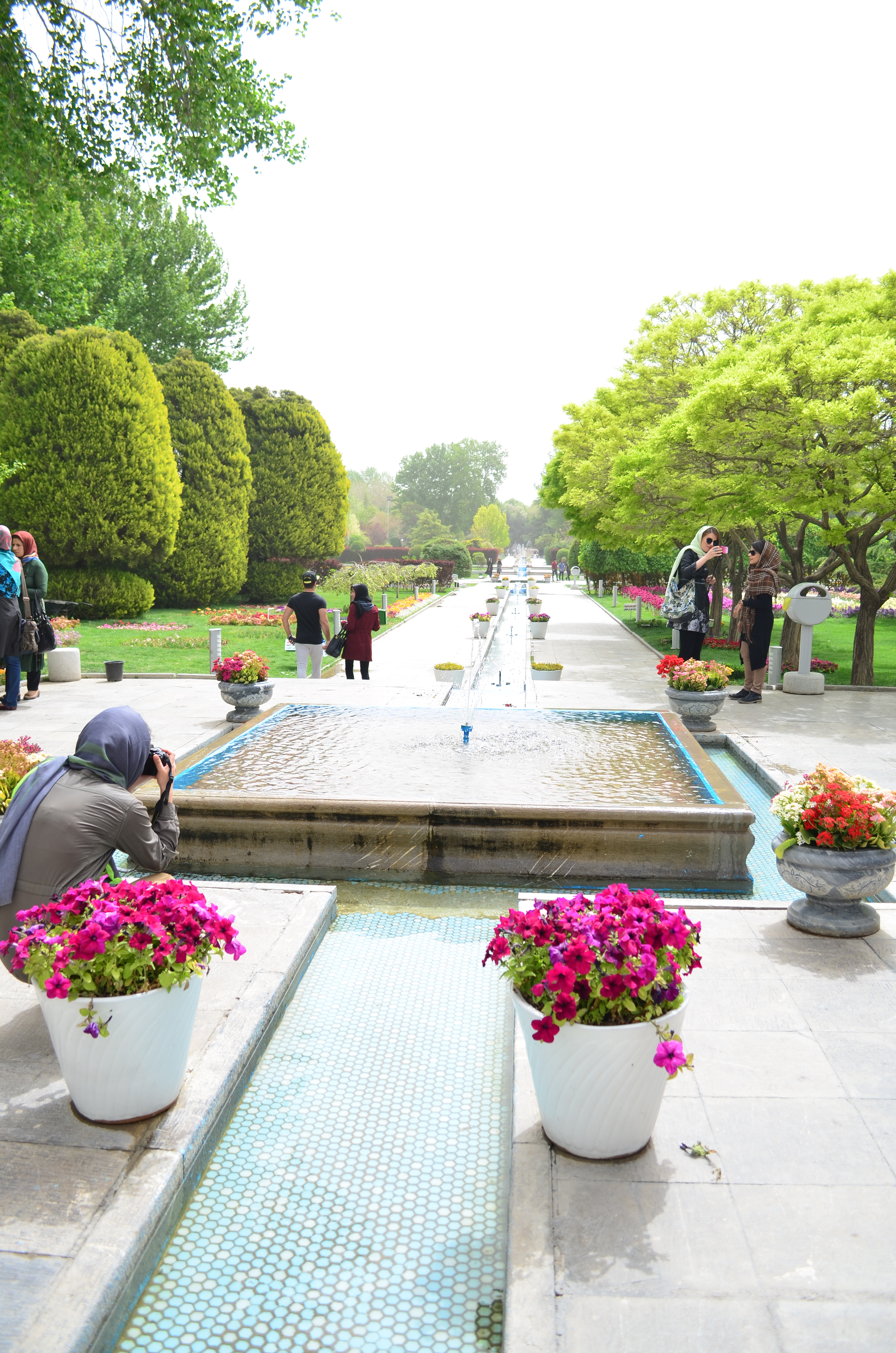
Flower garden of Isfahan

== The different parts of the garden ==
The entrance pavilion includes a building with the dimensions of 6x9 meters and a height of 6 m. At the ground floor, there's an information office. The whole landscape of the garden can be viewed from the deck of the building's first floor. The second floor includes a hall for showing movies and slides about various kinds of plants.

The Rock garden has 250 rock plant species covering an area of 2500 m^{2}.

The Water fall is located on the eastern side of the rock garden. It is 4 m high and constructed with various river stones.

The Pond on the southeastern side of the garden stretches over 3500 m^{2}. It helps freshen the air of the garden and for growing various water plants.

Playground for children separated from other parts of the garden by various kinds of hedges.

Main plant area wholly covered by lawn. The garden has been varied by planting different kinds of plants such as seasonal and permanent flowers and ornamental shrubs. In the center of the garden, a carpet-like design has been made by different flowers. The 5000 m^{2} paths are covered by granite stones with different shapes.

Rose garden for growing the various kinds of roses cultivated in Iran.

The Greenhouse has been built over 700 m^{2} on the northeastern side of the garden due to the shortage of flowers in winter.

The Herb garden covers 1170 m^{2} and has 132 species of herbs from different parts of Iran.
