= Frances Wheeler Sayler =

American activist

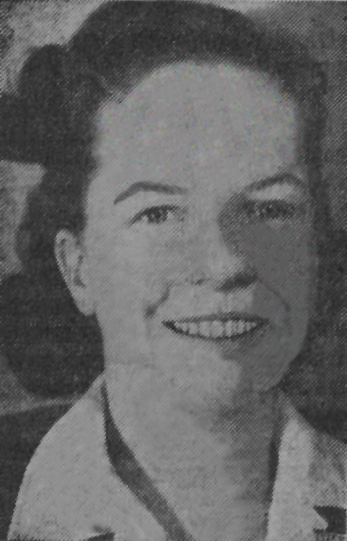
- Sayler, 1944
- Born: Frances Lee Wheeler; December 18, 1916; Butte, Montana, U.S.
- Died: April 27, 1957 (aged 40); Bethesda, Maryland, U.S.
- Education: Connecticut College
- Occupations: civil rights activist, labor organizer, and government worker
- Years active: 1937–1957

Frances Wheeler Sayler (December 18, 1916 – April 27, 1957) was an American civil rights and labor activist. She worked in the La Follette Committee and for the United States Women's Bureau, before became an organizer in the United Electrical, Radio and Machine Workers of America union. She was active in the early civil rights movement, fighting to desegregate facilities and abolish the poll tax.

== Early life and education ==
Frances Lee Wheeler was born on December 18, 1916, in Butte, Montana, to Lulu M. (née White) and Burton K. Wheeler. She was the middle daughter of the family of three girls and three boys: John L., Elizabeth H., Edward K., Frances, Richard B., and Marion M. Her father was a lawyer, who served as a US Senator from 1923 to 1947. She attended Mount Holyoke College and then completed her education at Connecticut College in 1937.

== Career ==
Wheeler began her career working for the United States Women's Bureau. In the mid-1930s, she served in the La Follette Committee, a government inquiry into anti-union policies used by employers in the interwar period. In 1938, she began working for the National Labor Relations Board. Wheeler was active in the women's poll tax repeal movement and in the early 1940s, served as an executive secretary of the National Committee to Abolish the Poll Tax. Using her networks, she was able to secure office space for the committee to the railroad union. She married Allen Sayler, a fellow government worker on August 15, 1941, in Sandy Spring, Maryland. Her parents refused to attend her wedding because of her and her husband's left-leaning politics.

Sayer and her husband first lived in Maryland. They were active in the early civil rights movement. She campaigned to desegregate movie theaters and restaurants in Bethesda, Chevy Chase, and Rockville. Allan promoted interracial education and organized a successful conference for the Elks Lodge in Washington, D.C. After she left government service in 1942, Sayler worked for the United Electrical, Radio and Machine Workers of America union, an affiliate of the Congress of Industrial Organizations. She acted as a liaison between unions and their members and government. She also was named to various labor advisory committees of the War Production Board to improve relationships between various industry sectors.

In 1945, Saylor moved to Detroit, Michigan, and worked as a labor organizer. She orchestrated the 1946 two-week strike joined by the workers at the Whyte Electric Company, which made nationwide headlines. She continued working with the United Electrical, Radio and Machine Workers of America until 1950, when she left because the birth of her first daughter, Diana. Three years later she had a second daughter, Gloria.

In 1955, Sayler was subpoenaed by the House Un-American Activities Committee and questioned for suspected ties to communism. Her father served as her legal counsel and though he did not support McCarthyism, he justified the actions of Joseph McCarthy, which was difficult for his daughter. She wanted to refuse her cooperation with the committee, but her father persuaded her to answer their questions and insist that she was not anti-American.

== Death and legacy ==
Sayler died from a brain tumor at the National Institutes of Health in Bethesda, Maryland, on April 27, 1957 Sayler researched and began writing her father's biography in 1946. She was unable to complete the work before her death, but in 1962, Paul F. Healy used her materials as the foundation for his book, Yankee from the West: The Candid, Turbulent Life Story of the Yankee-born U.S. Senator from Montana.
