= Burton K. Wheeler House =

Historic house in Montana, United States

- Wheeler, Burton K., House
- U.S. National Register of Historic Places
- U.S. National Historic Landmark
- U.S. National Historic Landmark District – Contributing property
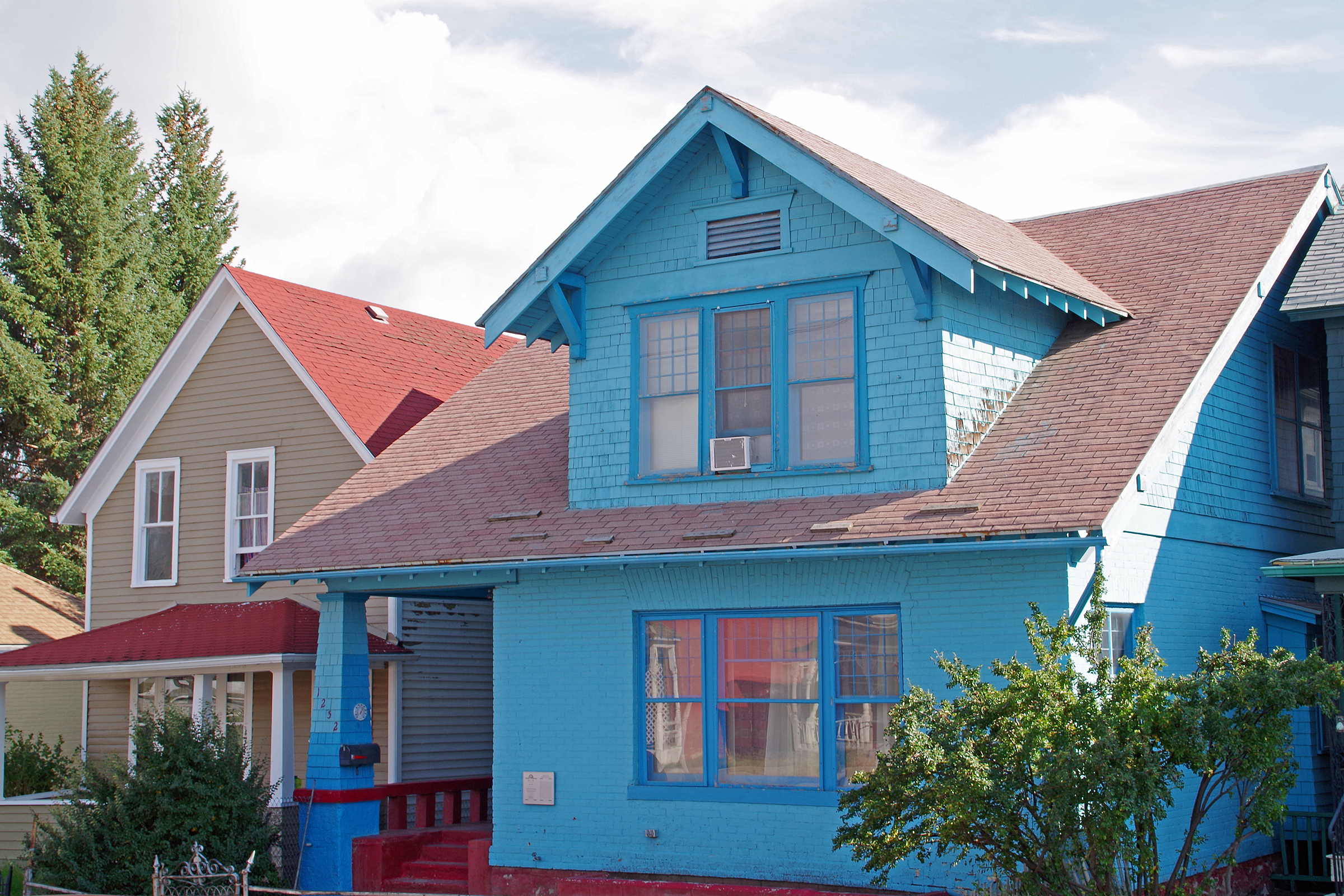
- House in 2013

- Location within Montana Location within the United States
- Location: 1232 East Second Street, Butte, Montana
- Coordinates: 46°0′20.3″N 112°31′12.55″W
- Built: 1908
- Part of: Butte–Anaconda Historic District (ID66000438)
- NRHP reference No.: 76001129

Significant dates
- Added to NRHP: December 8, 1976
- Designated NHL: December 8, 1976
- Designated NHLDCP: July 4, 1961

The Burton K. Wheeler House is a historic house at 1232 East 2nd Street in Butte, Montana, United States. Built about 1923, this modest working-class house was for many years the home of politician Burton K. Wheeler (1882–1975), a Democrat who in 1924 ran for United States Vice President on the Progressive Party ticket. His house was declared a National Historic Landmark in 1976.

== Description and history ==
The Burton K. Wheeler House stands in a densely built residential area east of downtown Butte that was traditionally a working-class neighborhood populated by mine workers. The house is separated from its neighbors by concrete paths, and is set back a short way from the sidewalk on the street. The house is 1 1/2 stories in height, with the first story built out of brick, and the upper half-story elements framed in wood and covered in wooden shingles. The front has a three-part window, with a larger central sash flanked by smaller sashes. To its left a recessed porch, its corner supported by a sloping square post with shingled exterior. The gable above the main window group has a deep eave supported by Craftsman brackets, and shows a band of three equal-sized sash windows.

The house was apparently built not long before its purchase in 1908 by Burton K. Wheeler. Wheeler lived here until 1923, when his rise in national politics brought him to Washington, D.C., as a United States senator. Although Wheeler's law practice had quickly made it possible for him to move to a more affluent area, he categorically refused, claiming that he enjoyed living among the working classes in the neighborhood, and that it was "worth extra votes every time I ran for office".

Wheeler became nationally prominent by investigating prosecutors who refused to go after individuals implicated in the Teapot Dome scandal. He bolted the Democratic Party to run with La Follette on the Progressive Party's presidential ticket; this ticket gained more votes than any other third-party campaign until 1968. In the 1930s he opposed Franklin Delano Roosevelt's New Deal domestic policies, and what he viewed were Roosevelt's foreign policies that would draw the country into what became World War II. His opposition to entry into the war cost him reelection in 1946.

== See also ==
- List of National Historic Landmarks in Montana
- National Register of Historic Places listings in Silver Bow County, Montana
