= Merrill K. Riddick =

American aviator and political candidate

Merrill Riddick

Personal details
- Born: Merrill Keith Riddick; March 7, 1895 Madison, Wisconsin, U.S.
- Died: March 9, 1988 (aged 93) Annapolis, Maryland, U.S.
- Party: Puritan Ethic and Epic, Magnetohydrodynamics and Prohibition Party
- Spouse: Helen May Williams (died 1949)
- Children: 3
- Parent: Carl W. Riddick (father)
- Relatives: Florence Riddick Boys (aunt)

Military service
- Branch/service: United States Army
- Battles/wars: World War I

Merrill Keith Riddick (March 7, 1895 – March 9, 1988) was an American aviator and perennial candidate. He was a candidate for President of the United States three times, affiliated with Puritan Ethic and Epic, Magnetohydrodynamics and Prohibition Party, which he founded.

== Early life ==
He was born on March 7, 1895, in Madison, Wisconsin. He moved to Eastern Montana at the age of 11. His father, Carl W. Riddick, served two terms as a member of the United States House of Representatives. His aunt, Florence Riddick Boys, was a writer and suffragette. At the age of 16, Riddick began traveling throughout the Northwest and became interested in the emerging field of aviation. In 1917, Riddick was a member of the first graduating class from the Army Air Force Aeronautics School in San Diego. He was sent to Europe during World War I to serve as an instructor and to fly reconnaissance.

== Career ==
After World War I, Riddick was among the first airmail pilots. Riddick and Charles A. Lindbergh barnstormed together and flew in the Harry Perkins Air Circus. While barnstorming, Riddick met and married his wife, Helen May Williams, from West Virginia. They had three children, Mary Ruth, Keith, and Barbara. In 1928, Riddick was an instructor at the first aviation preparatory school in Rochester, New York, where he instructed future president Franklin D. Roosevelt. Riddick re-joined the Air Force during World War II and served as a technical instructor. He was also a prospector who was involved in many different mining claims before and after the war

Riddick moved back to Montana after the war but continued traveling. After his wife died in 1949, Riddick became involved in politics. He was a resident of Granite County during his political campaigns, which were centered on natural resource management and campaign finance reform. He wrote and published the Journal of Applied Human Ecology, which focused on his plans for resource development. He ran for the Democratic nomination for Montana governor in 1960 and 1968, U.S. Congress in 1972, and was a presidential candidate in 1976, 1980, and 1984. Riddick ran for his self-created political party, the Magneto-hydrodynamics-Puritan Epic-Prohibition Party, and did not accept campaign contributions. Riddick campaigned across the nation, traveling only by passenger bus. After his presidential campaigns, Riddick moved to Annapolis, Maryland, and lived with his sister, Ruth.

== Death ==
Riddick died of cancer on March 9, 1988, in Annapolis, Maryland, two days after his 93rd birthday.
