= Burton K. Wheeler =

American politician and lawyer (1882–1975)

Burton Wheeler
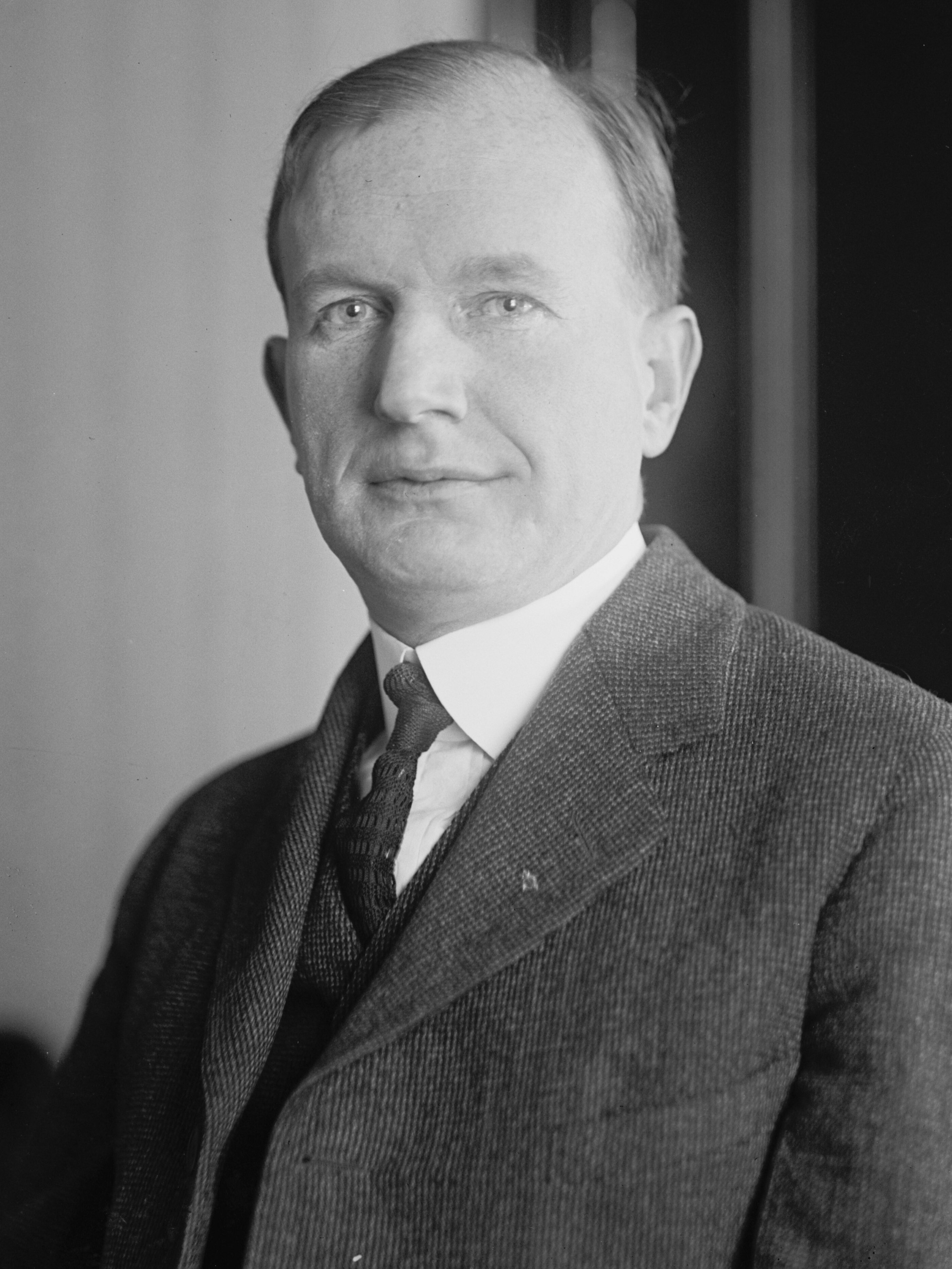
- Wheeler in 1922

United States Senator from Montana
- In office March 4, 1923 – January 3, 1947
- Preceded by: Henry L. Myers
- Succeeded by: Zales Ecton
Committee chairmanships
Chair of the Senate Indian Affairs Committee
In office March 4, 1933 – March 4, 1935
Preceded by	Lynn J. Frazier
Succeeded by	Elmer Thomas

United States Attorney for the District of Montana
- In office 1912 – October 1918

Member of the Montana House of Representatives
- In office 1910–1912

Personal details
- Born: Burton Kendall Wheeler; February 27, 1882 Hudson, Massachusetts, U.S.
- Died: January 6, 1975 (aged 92) Washington, D.C., U.S.
- Resting place: Rock Creek Cemetery; Washington, D.C., U.S.
- Party: Democratic
- Other political affiliations: Progressive (1924)
- Spouse: Lulu White
- Children: 6, including Frances
- Education: University of Michigan (LLB)

Burton Kendall Wheeler (February 27, 1882 – January 6, 1975) was an attorney and an American politician of the Democratic Party in Montana, which he represented as a United States senator from 1923 until 1947.

Born in Massachusetts, Wheeler began practicing law in Montana almost by chance, after losing his belongings while en route to Seattle. As the U.S. Attorney for Montana, he became known for his criticism of the Sedition Act of 1918 and defense of civil liberties during World War I. An independent Democrat who initially represented the progressive wing of the party, he received support from Montana's labor unions in his election to the Senate in 1922.

As a freshman senator, Wheeler played a crucial role in exposing the Harding administration's unwillingness to prosecute people involved in the Teapot Dome scandal. He ran for vice president in 1924 on the Progressive Party ticket headed by Wisconsin Senator Robert La Follette Sr. Supportive of some New Deal reforms, Wheeler broke with President Franklin D. Roosevelt on the issue of packing the Supreme Court. In foreign policy, from 1938 to 1941, he became a leader of the non-interventionist wing of the party, fighting against entry into World War II until the attack on Pearl Harbor.

Wheeler lost reelection in 1946 and retired to private practice in Washington, D.C.

== Early life ==
Wheeler was born in Hudson, Massachusetts, to Mary Elizabeth Rice (née Tyler) and Asa Leonard Wheeler. He grew up in Massachusetts, attending the public schools. He first worked as a stenographer in Boston.

He traveled west to attend University of Michigan Law School, where he graduated in 1905. He initially intended to settle in Seattle, but after getting off the train in Butte, Montana, he lost his belongings in a poker game. The new attorney settled there and began practicing law.

== Political career ==
=== 1910s ===
Wheeler was elected as a Montana state legislator in 1910, and in that position, he gained a reputation as a champion of labor against the Anaconda Copper Mining Company that dominated the state's economy and politics. He was appointed as a United States Attorney. During his tenure, he refused to prosecute alleged sedition cases during World War I, arguing that to do so would violate free speech. His refusal is significant as Montana was a stronghold of the Industrial Workers of the World. In other parts of the country, IWW membership was suppressed under the Sedition Act. Wheeler's defense of free speech was seen as unpatriotic if not treasonous by conservatives. He further riled conservatives when he served as defense attorney for William F. Dunne, a socialist newspaper editor who was accused of sedition. Wheeler's actions made him unpopular in the pro–World War I political climate, and he was forced to resign his office as a U.S. attorney in October 1918.

=== 1920s ===
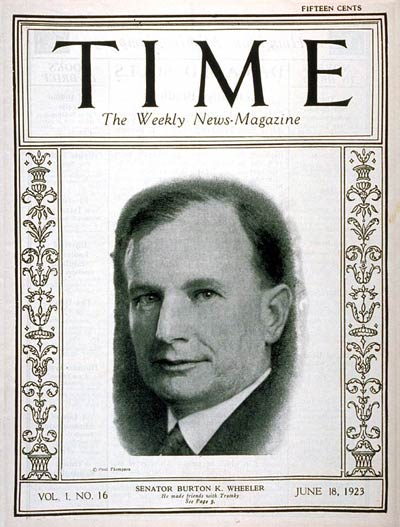
Time cover, June 18, 1923

In 1920, Wheeler ran for Governor of Montana, easily winning the Democratic primary, and he won the support of the Non-Partisan League in the general election. The ticket included a multi-racial set of candidates, unusual for 1920, including an African American and a Blackfoot Indian. Wheeler was defeated by Republican former U.S. Senator Joseph M. Dixon.

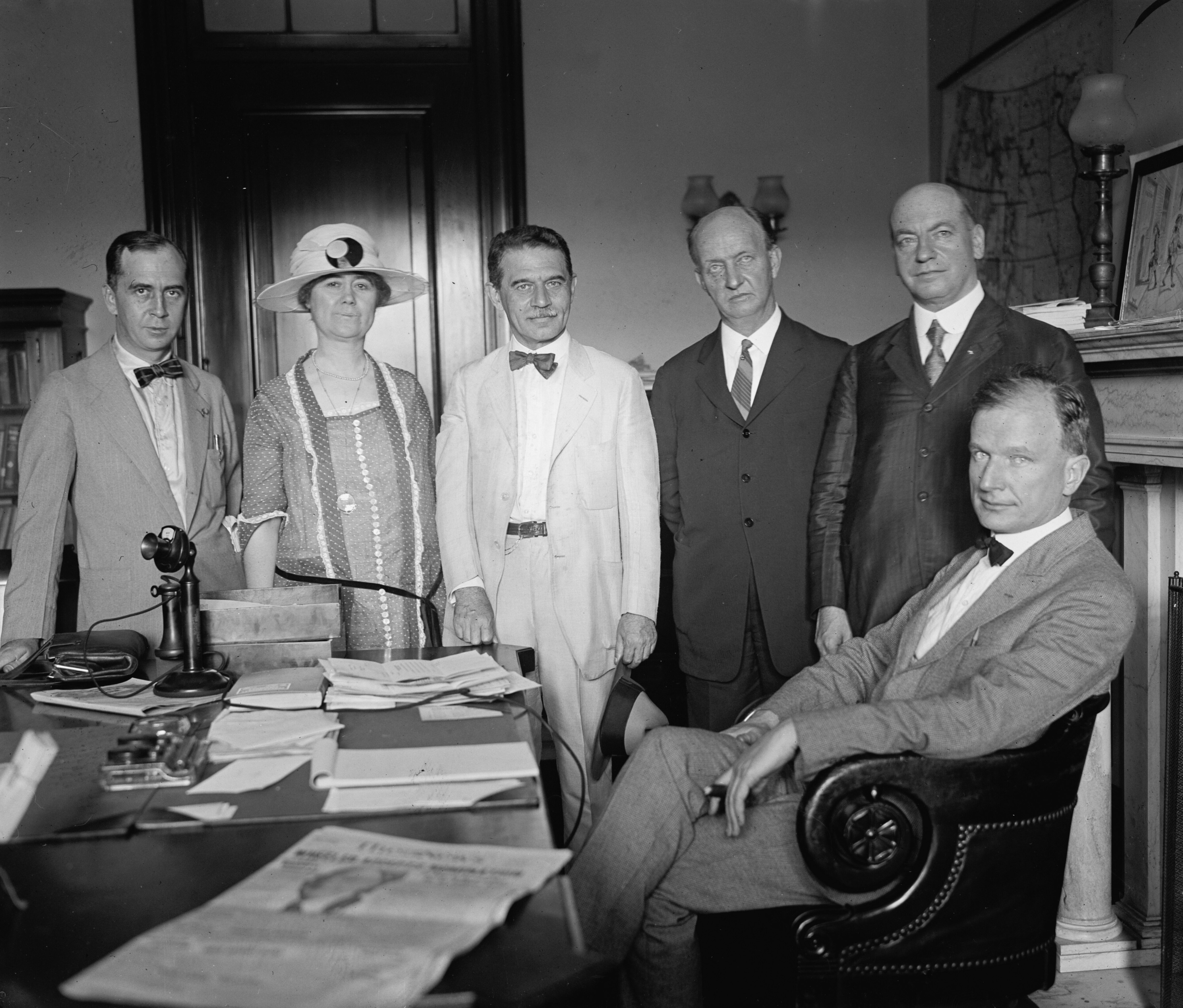
Wheeler (seated, far right) with a Progressive Party committee sent to offer him the nomination for Vice President, July 19, 1924 Left to right: Basil M. Manly, Mabel Cory Costigan, Morris Hillquit, John M. Nelson, William H. Johnston.

Wheeler ran as a Democrat for the Senate in 1922, and was elected over Congressman Carl W. Riddick, the Republican nominee, with 55% of the vote. He broke with the Democratic Party in 1924 to run for Vice President of the United States on the Progressive Party ticket led by La Follette. They carried one state—La Follette's Wisconsin—and ran well in union areas and railroad towns.

Early on in his career as a U.S. senator, Wheeler played a leading role in exposing the Harding administration's unwillingness to prosecute administration officials involved in the Teapot Dome scandal. His special committee held sensational Senate hearings regarding bribery and other corruption in Attorney General Harry M. Daugherty's Justice Department, which ultimately resulted in the indictment of Daugherty and others. He voted for the Immigration Act of 1924 which limited Catholic and Jewish immigration, and almost entirely banned Asian immigrants. In 1925, Wheeler faced investigation, without major impact, by Blair Coan, a Justice Department investigator from Chicago, who suspected Wheeler of involvement in communist conspiracy. In an otherwise negative assessment of Wheeler's career and views, journalist John Gunther called the indictment "pure vindictive retaliation, a frameup," laying the blame upon Attorney General Daugherty.

Wheeler returned to the Democratic Party after the election, which Republican Calvin Coolidge won in an Electoral College landslide. He served a total of four terms and was re-elected in 1928, 1934, and 1940.

=== 1930s ===
In 1930, Wheeler gained national attention when he successfully campaigned for the reelection to the U.S. Senate of his friend and Democratic colleague Thomas Gore, the colorful "Blind Cowboy" of Oklahoma. Wheeler supported President Franklin D. Roosevelt's election, and many of his New Deal policies. He broke with Roosevelt over his opposition to the Judicial Procedures Reform Bill of 1937, and also opposed much of Roosevelt's foreign policy before World War II. In the 1940 presidential election, there was a large movement to "Draft Wheeler" into the presidential race, possibly as a third party candidate, led primarily by John L. Lewis.

In 1938, Wheeler introduced Senate Resolution 294, a "sense of the senate" statement that, in order to ensure fair competition, AM radio stations in the United States should be limited to a transmitter power of 50,000 watts. Now commonly known as the Wheeler resolution, it was approved on June 13, 1938 and the next year the Federal Communications Commission implemented a 50,000 watt cap, which still remains in force.

=== 1940s ===
==== America First Committee ====
Wheeler, an outspoken non-interventionist, opposed U.S. entry into World War II.

He strongly supported the isolationist America First Committee but never joined. He gave advice and many speeches to its chapters. His wife Lulu was on its national committee and she was the treasurer of the Washington, D.C., chapter. Because he and other speakers at an antiwar rally, including Norman Thomas, gave the palm-out Bellamy Salute, critics drew comparisons to the Nazi salute. The Bellamy Salute had been widely used in the U.S. since the 1890s.

As chair of the "Wheeler Committee" (formally, the Subcommittee to Investigate Railroads, Holding Companies, and Related Matters of the United States Senate Committee on Interstate and Foreign Commerce), Wheeler announced in August 1941 he would investigate “interventionists” in the motion picture industry, which his detractors characterized as anti-Semitic. He questioned why so many foreign-born favored American participation in the war. "Critics charged that the Committee was motivated by animus to Jewish studio heads." Representing the studios was 1940 Republican presidential candidate Wendell Willkie who charged that Wheeler and other critics sought to impose the same kind of censorship that Nazi Germany was enacting all over Europe. Wheeler also led the attack on Roosevelt's Lend Lease Bill, charging that if passed "it would plow under every fourth American boy". Roosevelt in response charged that Wheeler's statement was "the damnedest thing said in a generation".

After the start of World War II in Europe, Wheeler opposed aid to Britain or France. On October 17, 1941, Wheeler said: "I can't conceive of Japan being crazy enough to want to go to war with us." One month later, he added: "If we go to war with Japan, the only reason will be to help England." The United States Army's secret Victory Program was leaked on December 4, 1941 to Wheeler, who passed this information on to three newspapers.

==== World War II ====
Following Japan's attack on Pearl Harbor, Wheeler supported a declaration of war saying, "The only thing now to do is to lick the hell out of them."

Wheeler had always considered himself to be a champion of civil liberties for unpopular groups and World War II was no exception. Agreeing with such critics of the Smith Act as Senator Robert A. Taft and leading constitutional scholar Zechariah Chafee, he regarded the Sedition Trial of 1944 a "disgrace" and a scheme to smear more mainstream critics of FDR's pre-war foreign policy. Wheeler also criticized the internment of Japanese Americans though he apparently did not speak out publicly. In 1962, he recalled that he had "protested to various high-level government officials", including his friend Under Secretary of War Robert P. Patterson, asserting that internment violated the "principles of the Four Freedoms". He warned that if the government "can get away with such treatment of citizens of Japanese descent, it can do the same to any minority".

In 1945, Wheeler was among the seven senators who opposed full United States entry into the United Nations.

Wheeler sought renomination in 1946 but was defeated in the Democratic primary by Leif Erickson, who attacked Wheeler as insufficiently liberal and for his "pre-war isolationist" views. Erickson in turn was defeated by Republican state representative Zales Ecton. Wheeler's defeat has been attributed, in part, to a pamphlet by David George Plotkin entitled The Plot Against America: Senator Wheeler and the Forces Behind Him. Published by supporters of the Communist Party, the pamphlet accused Wheeler, along with President Harry S. Truman, of being part of a fascist conspiracy. Montana writer Joseph Kinsey Howard called it "one of the worst books ever written" about a politician. It later emerged that the pamphlet had been backed by an aide of Jerry J. O'Connell, a political rival of Wheeler's in Montana politics.

One political commentator characterized the fall of Wheeler's political fortunes by the end of his career:

Though Wheeler was accused of becoming a conservative, even reactionary, he remained consistent to the Populist-Progressive tradition in blaming eastern bankers for his ills. In his early years he lumped together the eastern financial interests with capitalism; in 1946 they were partners in crime with Communism. The man was the same, as were his methods, but his sense of timing and knowledge of the Montana voter were not as acute as they had been. By 1946, Wheeler was more acceptable to conservatives than liberals.

=== 1950s and 1960s ===
On September 15, 1950, Wheeler served as counsel to Max Lowenthal, a fellow Democrat from Minnesota, as the latter testified before the House Un-American Activities Committee.

Wheeler did not return to politics, nor full-time to Montana, but took up his law practice in Washington, D.C. Aided by research from his daughter, Frances (died 1957), Wheeler wrote his autobiography, with Paul F. Healy, Yankee from the West, published in 1962 by Doubleday & Company. He dedicated the book to his wife and daughter.

In the book, Wheeler rejected the characterization that his political career represented a "classic swing from left to right", writing that his ideology had remained the same, supporting liberals in defending justice for the individual and opposing concentrated economic power, while agreeing with conservatives in their opposition to excessive centralization of power in the federal government. He criticized contemporary liberals from departing from the historical liberal concern with legislative government by favoring greater executive power at the expense of Congress. Wheeler also accused contemporary liberals of being intolerant of dissent, arguing that they demanded complete comformity with their views.

== Personal life, death, and legacy ==
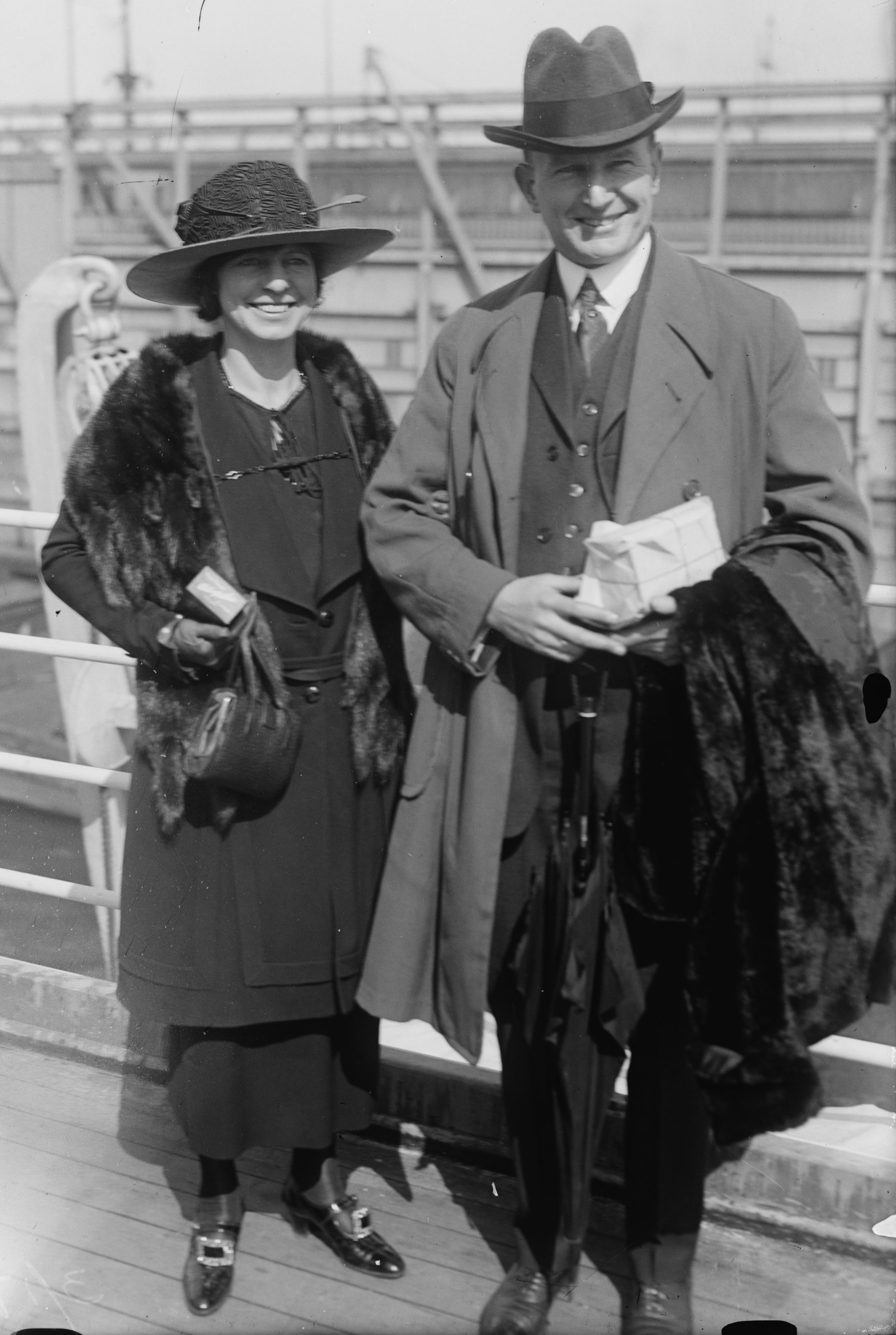
Wheeler and his wife Lulu M. White in 1923

Wheeler married Lulu M. White. She was a major political advisor. They had six children: John, Elizabeth, Edward, Frances, Richard, and Marion. One of his great grandchildren (a grand-daughter of Edward), was named Willa K. Snow. Frances helped her father with his research for his autobiography, Yankee from the West: The Candid, Turbulent Life Story of the Yankee-born U.S. Senator from Montana, which he published in 1962 and dedicated to her and his wife.

Wheeler died age 92 on January 6, 1975, in Washington, D.C., and is interred in the District of Columbia's Rock Creek Cemetery. His Butte home is a National Historic Landmark in recognition of his national political role.

In 2004, political writer Bill Kauffman of The American Conservative described Wheeler as an "anti-draft, anti-war, anti-big business defender of civil liberties".

== In popular culture ==
- The 1939 film Mr. Smith Goes to Washington and its source material, the unpublished novel The Gentleman from Montana, were loosely based on Wheeler's experience investigating the Harding administration.
- In Philip Roth's alternate history novel The Plot Against America (2004), and its television adaptation, Wheeler serves as vice president during the fictional presidency of Charles Lindbergh. Roth depicted Wheeler as a political opportunist, who, while serving as acting president during Lindbergh's absence, imposes martial law. (However, Wheeler had historically been known as a leading opponent of the martial law imposed by the Governor of Montana Sam V. Stewart during World War I.)
- In a lesser-known alternate history novel, The Divide (1980) by William Overgard, Wheeler becomes president in 1940, campaigning on a platform of isolationism despite Axis victories (far larger than those which actually occurred). When the U.S. belatedly enters the war, it is defeated in 1946 and partitioned between Nazi Germany and Imperial Japan, and Wheeler is ultimately executed as a war criminal.

== See also ==
- List of United States senators expelled or censured; Wheeler was exonerated by the Senate 56-5.

== Works cited ==
- Johnson, Marc C. (2019). Political Hell-Raiser – The Life and Times of Senator Burton K. Wheeler of Montana. University of Oklahoma Press. ISBN 9780806163765.

Party political offices
Preceded by Sam V. Stewart	Democratic nominee for Governor of Montana; 1920	Succeeded by John Erickson
Preceded by Henry L. Myers	Democratic nominee for U.S. Senator from Montana (Class 1); 1922, 1928, 1934, 1940	Succeeded by Leif Erickson
New political party	Progressive nominee for Vice President of the United States; 1924	Party dissolved
U.S. Senate
Preceded by Henry L. Myers	U.S. Senator (Class 1) from Montana; 1923–1947; Served alongside: Thomas J. Walsh, John Erickson, James E. Murray	Succeeded by Zales Ecton
Preceded by Lynn Frazier	Chair of the Senate Indian Affairs Committee; 1933–1936	Succeeded by Elmer Thomas
Preceded by Clarence Dill	Chair of the Senate Interstate Commerce Committee; 1936–1947	Succeeded by Wallace White as Chair of the Senate Interstate and Foreign Commerce Committee
Honorary titles
Preceded by John N. Heiskell	Most Senior Living U.S. Senator; Sitting or Former; 1972–1975; Served alongside: Clarence Dill	Succeeded by Clarence Dill
Awards and achievements
Preceded by Herbert L. Pratt	Cover of Time; 18 June 1923	Succeeded by Edward M. House
