= Carl W. Riddick =

American journalist (1872–1960)

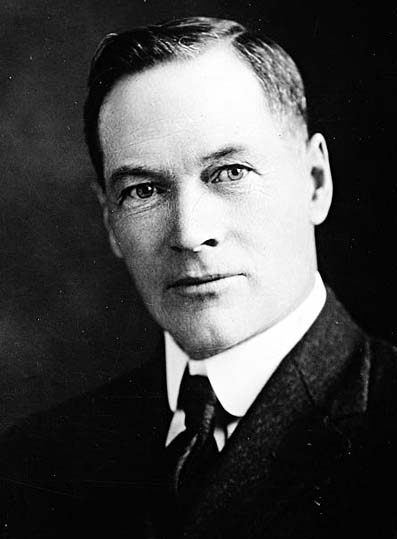

Member of the U.S. House of Representatives from Montana's 2nd district
- In office March 4, 1919 – March 3, 1923
- Preceded by: District created
- Succeeded by: Scott Leavitt

Personal details
- Born: Carlos Wood Riddick; February 25, 1872 Wells, Minnesota, U.S.
- Died: July 9, 1960 (aged 88) Fort Lauderdale, Florida, U.S.
- Party: Republican
- Relations: Florence Riddick (sister); Merrill K. Riddick (son)

Carlos Wood Riddick (February 25, 1872 – July 9, 1960) was an American politician and businessman. He served as a Republican member of the U.S. House of Representatives from Montana's 2nd congressional district.

== Early life and education ==
Riddick was born in Wells, Faribault County, Minnesota, and was educated in the public schools in Michigan. He attended Albion College in Albion, Michigan and Lawrence University in Appleton, Wisconsin. His sister, Florence Riddick Boys (1873–1963), was a journalist, suffragist, and state official in Indiana.

== Career ==
From 1899 to 1910, Riddick was editor of the Winamac Republican newspaper in Indiana. Following that, he was a rancher and County Assessor of Fergus Co., Montana.

In 1918, Montana's at-large congressional district, which elected two separate members, was abolished, and the 1st and 2nd districts were created in its place. One of the at-large representatives, John M. Evans, opted to run for re-election in the 1st district, while the other, Jeannette Rankin, instead opted to run for the Senate. Riddick ran in the newly created 2nd district and was narrowly elected over Harry B. Mitchell, the Democratic nominee. He was re-elected in a landslide over M. McCusker in 1920. Rather than seek re-election to a third term, he opted to run for the United States Senate in 1922 to replace retiring Senator Henry L. Myers. Riddick won the Republican primary over State Attorney General Wellington D. Rankin, but in the general election, he lost to Burton K. Wheeler, the Democratic nominee, by a wide margin.

After leaving politics, Riddick served as president of the National Republic, a magazine published in Washington, D.C. He was the operator of a home development at Sylvan Shores in South River, Maryland.

== Personal life ==
In his later years, Riddick lived in Maryland and Florida. His son, Merrill K. Riddick, was an aviator and perennial candidate.

Riddick died on July 9, 1960, in Fort Lauderdale, Florida. He is interred at Hillcrest Memorial Cemetery in Annapolis, Maryland.

Party political offices
Preceded by Charles Nelson Pray	Republican nominee for U.S. Senator from Montana (Class 1); 1922	Succeeded by Joseph M. Dixon
U.S. House of Representatives
Preceded by District created	Member of the U.S. House of Representatives from Montana's 2nd congressional district 1919-1923	Succeeded by Scott Leavitt
