= Butte, Anaconda and Pacific Railway =

Short line railroad in Montana, U.S.

- Rarus Railway
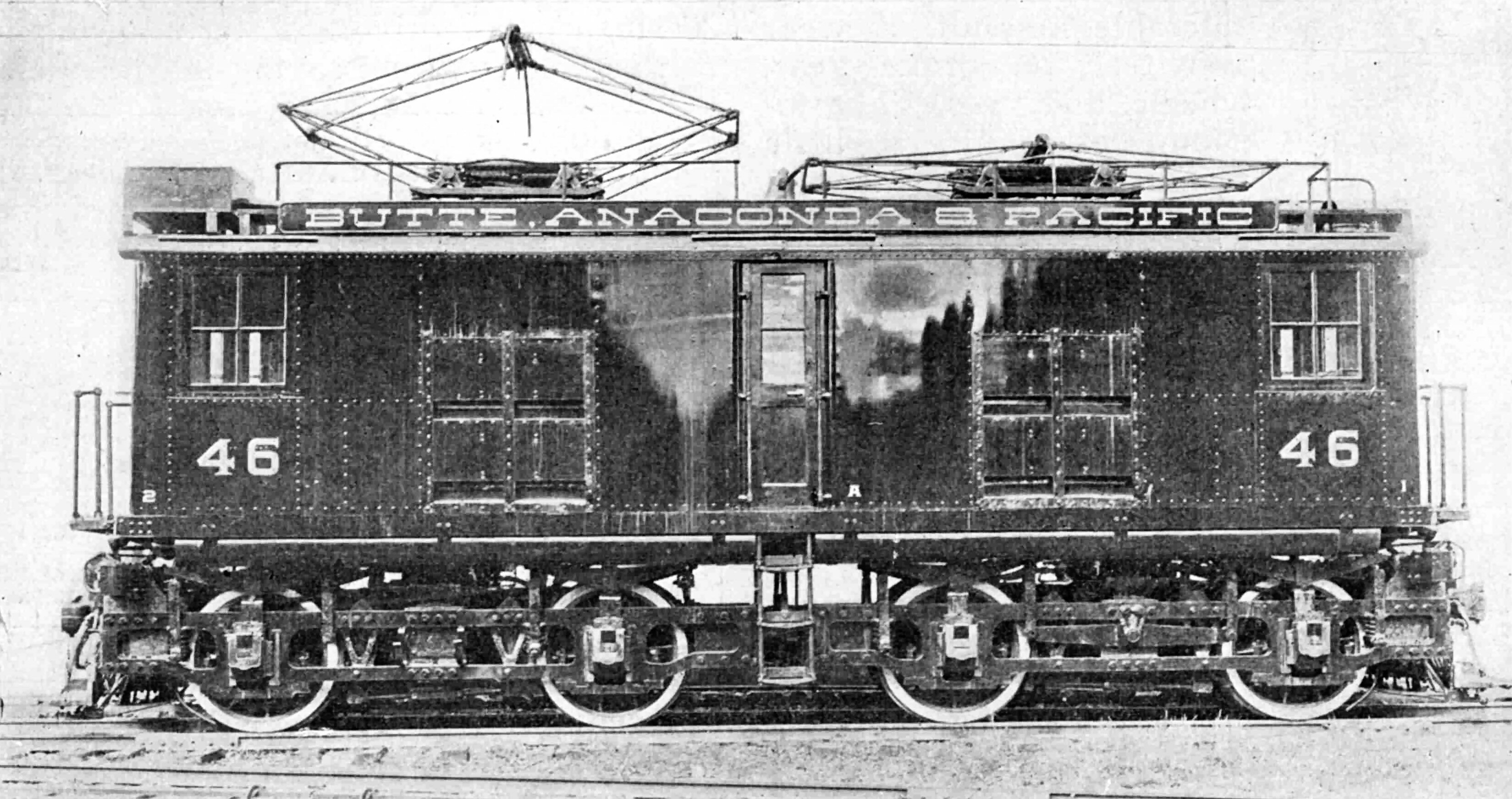
- Electric locomotive BAP #45

Overview
- Main region: Montana
- Parent company: Patriot Rail Corporation
- Headquarters: Anaconda, Montana
- Founders: Marcus Daly
- Reporting mark: BAP
- Dates of operation: 1891–present

Technical
- Track gauge: 4 ft 8 1/2 in (1,435 mm) standard gauge
- No. of tracks: 1

The Butte, Anaconda and Pacific Railway (reporting mark BAP) is a shortline railroad in the U.S. state of Montana. Founded in 1891, it was the main conduit for ore transport between Butte and Anaconda.

The railroad operated as the BA&P until its sale in 1985, when it was renamed the Rarus Railway (RARW). In May 2007, the railroad was sold to the Patriot Rail Corporation and in July of that year its original name restored.

The BA&P was used for filming of portions of the 1985 movie Runaway Train.

== Founding ==
In 1890, a dispute between the Montana Union Railway and the Anaconda Copper Company arose over the cost to transport copper ore from the Butte mines to the Anaconda, Montana, smelters. Marcus Daly, the interest behind the Anaconda Copper Mining Company, financed the incorporation of the Butte, Anaconda and Pacific in 1891, and operation began just two years later, in 1893. While transport of ore from Butte to Anaconda was central to the line's founding, the BA&P was chartered as a common carrier and carried passengers and general freight.

== Early years ==
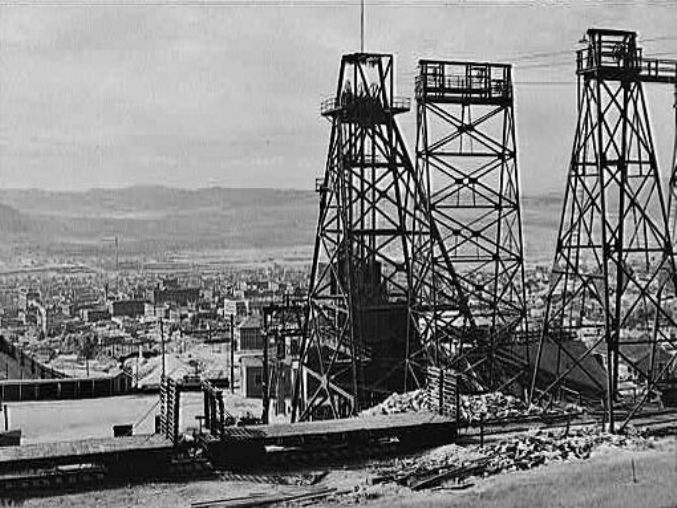
Headframes of the Anaconda Copper Mining Company, looking over the town of Butte, MT

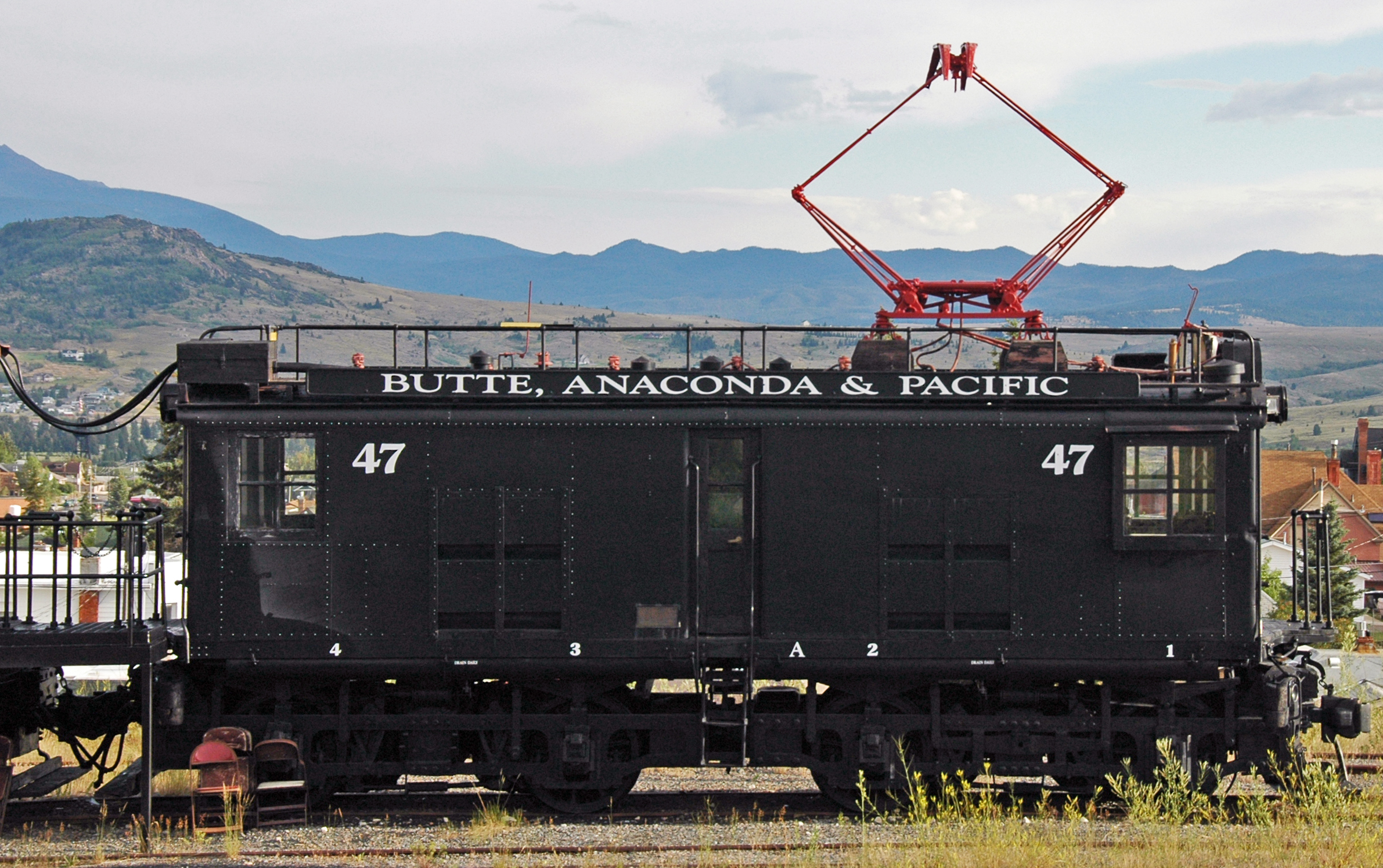
Butte, Anaconda and Pacific boxcab #47 on display in Butte.

When it first opened, the BA&P used steam locomotives to haul the ore, freight, and passenger trains, however the heavy daily use took its toll on the engines, and by 1910 alternative power sources were being sought. The BA&P was an electrification pioneer, electrifying 75 mi (121 km) out of 114 mi (183 km) between 1912 and 1913. The work was performed by General Electric and the railroad's own staff. Power was delivered from Great Falls, 125 mi (201 km) to the northeast, and converted from AC to DC via several substations along the railway. While the common voltages used were 600 or 1200 volts DC, BA&P electrification was the highest available at that time, being 2,400 volts DC. A cotemporaneous article described the work:

The length of this line was 30 miles, having a total of 114 miles of single trackage, and considerable heavy grade. The electric locomotives hauled heavy ore trains and the operating results from every viewpoint far exceeded expectations. Mr. John D. Ryan, principal owner of this road,[...] (says) that "the cost was within the original estimate, the operation has been an unqualified success and the economy at least 50% in excess of the promises of the engineers at the time the work was undertaken. The tonnage handled over the lines increased over 50% in three years; no difficulty has been found in moving the increase, and in the opinion of the railway managers the main line and two of the principal branches had reached the capacity of single track when electrification came into use."

— E.W. Rice Jr.

Seventeen new 80-short-ton (73 t) electric locomotives were ordered from General Electric, with two being passenger locomotives and fifteen being freight locomotives. The two passenger locomotives were outfitted with double pantographs, dual headlights, and were geared for a standard running speed of 45 mph (72 km/h) while pulling three coaches. In contrast, the freight locomotives had single headlights and one pantograph each, and were geared for a standard speed of 35 mph (56 km/h). In 1914 four more locomotives were ordered from General Electric; these were geared lower than the other freight units and intended to be used at slow speeds in the smelter and Butte mine yards. The 1913 GE locomotives were marked as numbers 50–66, the 1914 units 46–49, the 1916 units 42–45.

During the era of electrification, passenger service typically consisted of four daily roundtrips between Butte and Anaconda (typically with locomotive #65 or #66 pulling two passenger cars and a baggage car). By contrast, a freight run regularly extended to sixty 18-short-ton (16,000 kg) cars each carrying 50 short tons (45 t) of ore, for a total mass of 4,080 short tons (3,700 t). Such trains would be divided in the West Anaconda yard for multiple lower-geared locomotives to take to the smelter for unloading.

== De-electrification ==
The electrification was abandoned in 1967 as it had become cheaper to operate diesel-electric locomotives.

== Sale ==
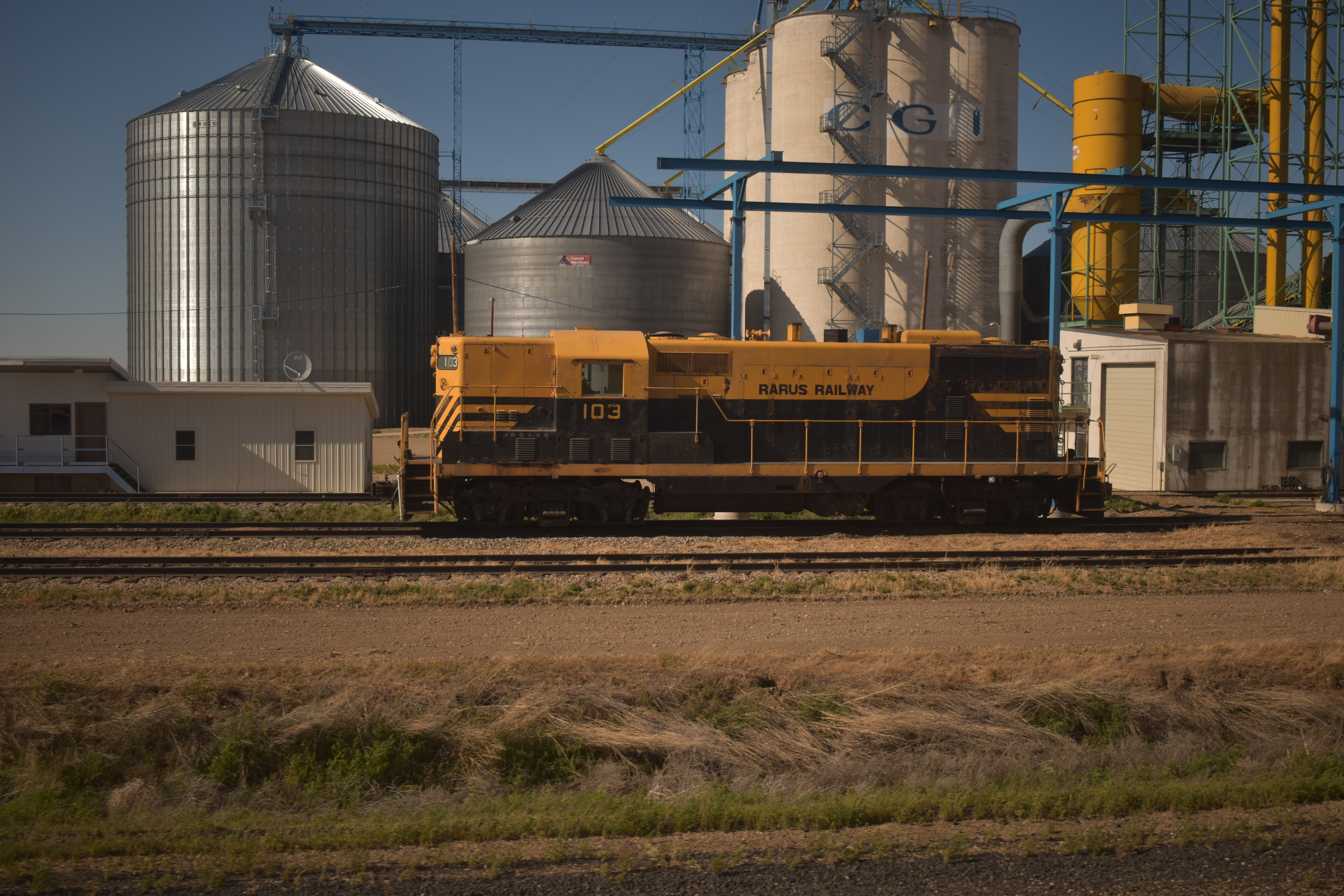
#103, a GP7, retains its Rarus Railway scheme as of 2019.

The railroad lost much of its business following the closure of the Anaconda smelter, and was sold to a consortium of local investors and reconstituted as the Rarus Railway (reporting mark RARW) in 1985.

On July 19, 2007, Patriot Rail Corporation, the parent company which had acquired Rarus Railway in May 2007, officially changed the railways name back to Butte, Anaconda and Pacific Railway.

== Preservation ==
Many resources of the railway were included in the Butte, Anaconda and Pacific Railway Historic District, which was listed on the National Register of Historic Places in 1988.

== Film credit ==
In 1985, The BA&P became the backdrop of full-length feature film Runaway Train. The film, directed by Andrei Konchalovsky, starred Jon Voight, who was nominated for an Academy Award & won the Golden Globe Award for Best Actor, Eric Roberts, who was nominated for an Academy Award & Golden Globe Award for Best Supporting Actor, Rebecca DeMornay, John P. Ryan, Kyle T. Heffner, Kenneth McMillan & Edward Bunker who also co-wrote the script. It was filmed on BA&P track and at the Anaconda roundhouse in March 1985. The film was also nominated for the Golden Globe Award for Best Picture - Drama.

== See also ==
- Milwaukee Road
