= Wheeler resolution =

U.S. Senate resolution on limitation of AM radio station power

Senate Resolution 294, Limitation of Power of Radio Broadcast Stations, commonly known as the Wheeler resolution, is a United States Senate resolution Introduced by Senator Burton K. Wheeler (D-Montana) and adopted on June 13, 1938, which recommended that the Federal Communications Commission (FCC) fix the maximum power used by AM radio broadcasting stations at 50,000 watts. Shortly thereafter the FCC formally adopted the suggested 50,000 watt cap, which still remains the limit.

== Background ==
On June 9, 1938, Senator Wheeler submitted a resolution for consideration by the full body:

Resolved, That it is the sense of the Senate of the United States of America that the operation of radio broadcast stations in the standard broadcast band (550 to 1600 kilocycles) with power in excess of 50 kilowatts is definitely against the public interest, in that such operation would tend to concentrate political, social, and economic power and influence in the hands of a very small group, and is against the public interest for the further reason that the operation of broadcast stations with power in excess of 50 kilowatts has been demonstrated to have adverse and injurious economic effects on other stations operating with less power, in depriving such stations of revenue and in limiting the ability of such stations to adequately or efficiently serve the social, religious, educational, civic, and other like organizations and institutions in the communities in which such stations are located and which must and do depend on such stations for the carrying on of community welfare work generally.
Resolved further, That it is, therefore, the sense of the Senate of the United States of America that the Federal Communications Commission should not adopt or promulgate rules to permit or otherwise allow any station operating on a frequency in the standard broadcast band (550 to 1600 kilocycles) to operate on a regular or other basis with power in excess of 50 kilowatts.

— "Limitation of Power of Radio Broadcast Stations" (U.S. Senate Resolution 294 (1938))

At the time this resolution was introduced, FM and TV stations did not yet exist, and there were fewer than 700 AM stations, many struggling economically due to the effects of the Great Depression. In 1928, under the provisions of the Federal Radio Commission's (FRC) General Order 40, broadcasting stations had been divided into three main categories: "local", limited to 100 watts, "regional", limited to 1,000 watts, and "clear", generally capped at 50,000 watts. Subsequently, the daytime maximum for local stations had been raised to 250 watts, and to 5,000 watts for regional stations. Wheeler's resolution was related to the fact that the FCC was preparing to hold a series of hearing reviewing the future of the AM broadcasting band, including transmitting power levels.

In 1938 there already was one station, WLW in Cincinnati, Ohio, operating with significantly higher power than 50,000 watts. Beginning in 1934 WLW received a series of temporary authorizations to use 500,000 watts, moreover, the FCC had received applications from more than a dozen additional stations to start using powers above 50,000 watts. The prospect of numerous "superpower" stations made many lower powered stations concerned that they would be "drowned out" and unable to compete economically, which would lead to a reduction in the number of operating stations. Wheeler, an avid anti-monopolist, also warned that domination of the airwaves by high-powered stations could lead to the rise of a dictator like Mussolini in Italy, Hitler in Germany or Stalin in the Soviet Union, each of whom used control of radio broadcasting to aid their seizures of power.

Wheeler's Resolution 294 was adopted by the full senate on June 13. Although Senator Robert J. Bulkley (D-Ohio) entered a motion to reconsider the vote, he withdrew the motion the next day. A resolution, unlike a law, was not binding on the FCC, however it was seen as having an important influence on the outcome of its hearings.

== Impact ==
After concluding the hearings, in early 1939 the FCC announced its new regulations, which narrowed the power differences between low and high-powered stations. Local stations could now use up to 250 watts at night, and regional stations 5,000 watts. On the other hand, in language that largely echoed the financial arguments of the Wheeler resolution, clear channel stations were still limited to 50,000 watts, and WLW's authorization to use 500,000 watts, except experimentally during early morning hours, was terminated. Although subsequently many AM stations in other countries, especially in Europe and Asia, would use far greater powers, in the United States the Wheeler resolution's 50,000 watt cap has remained in place.
