= Florence Riddick Boys =

American writer, clubwoman, suffragist and state probation officer

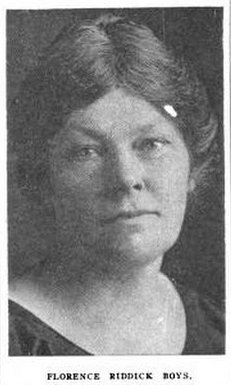
- Born: Florence Alice Riddick; December 3, 1873; Litchfield, Minnesota, U.S.
- Died: May 10, 1963 (aged 89); Plymouth, Indiana, U.S.
- Other name: Florence R. Boys
- Occupations: Writer, clubwoman, activist
- Spouse: Samuel Evan Boys (m. 1898-1963; her death)
- Children: 5
- Relatives: Carl Riddick (brother)

Florence Riddick Boys (née Florence Alice Riddick; December 3, 1873 – May 10, 1963) was an American writer, clubwoman, suffragist, and state probation officer in Indiana.

== Early life ==
Florence Alice Riddick was born in 1873 in Litchfield, Minnesota, the daughter of Isaac Hancock Riddick and Alice Esther (Wood) Riddick. Her mother died just seven days after her birth on December 10, 1873, at the age of 25; her father, a Methodist minister, remarried in 1876. Her brother Carl W. Riddick served one term in the United States Congress as a Republican, representing Montana, and his son was politician and aviator Merrill K. Riddick. In 1896 Florence Riddick graduated from her parents' alma mater, Albion College in Michigan, where she was editor of the school newspaper and "class poetess".

== Career ==
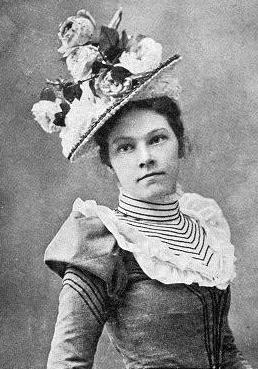
Florence Riddick Boys, from a 1902 poetry collection.

=== Journalism ===
After marriage, she moved to Plymouth, Indiana, where she lived for the rest of her life. There, she wrote a column for the "woman's page" of the Plymouth Pilot and the Daily Republican, newspapers her husband published. She wrote poetry, advice, recipes, and essays for the papers. Her women's page was syndicated for use in other newspapers in 1920. Her features appeared in more than fifty papers by 1924, and at its peak in 140 newspapers, including one in New Zealand, before she retired the feature in 1942. She attended meetings of the Indiana Republican Editorial Association with her husband.

=== Suffrage and politics ===
Boys was county chair of the Woman's Franchise League in Plymouth. After the suffrage campaign was won, she became the first Woman's Publicity Director for the Republican National Committee. She wrote for the National Republican, a weekly national newspaper produced by the party. "If ever, in wistful mood, I sighed for a medium of expression, my wildest dreams have come true," she wrote of her work as a political press agent, in 1922; "one visualizes the great body of women voters keen to equip themselves in their new field of activity." She was described as "one of the real national authorities of women in politics" when she addressed the Inland Daily Press Association in Chicago in 1923. She was a delegate to the Republican National Convention in 1924, and an alternate delegate in 1932. She wrote Why Watson? (1925), a book about politician James Eli Watson.

Boys was Indiana's State Probation Officer from 1926 to at least 1931, leading work on juvenile delinquency in the state, lecturing, and editing the Indiana Probation News publication. In the 1930s she chaired the Corrections and Public Welfare departments of the Indiana Federation of Clubs.

== Personal life ==
She married lawyer and newspaper publisher Samuel Evan Boys in 1898. They had five children together, born between 1899 and 1914. She died in 1963, aged 89, in Plymouth, Indiana. Her papers are in the Indiana State Library.
