= Socialist Labor Party Hall =

- U.S. National Register of Historic Places
- U.S. National Historic Landmark
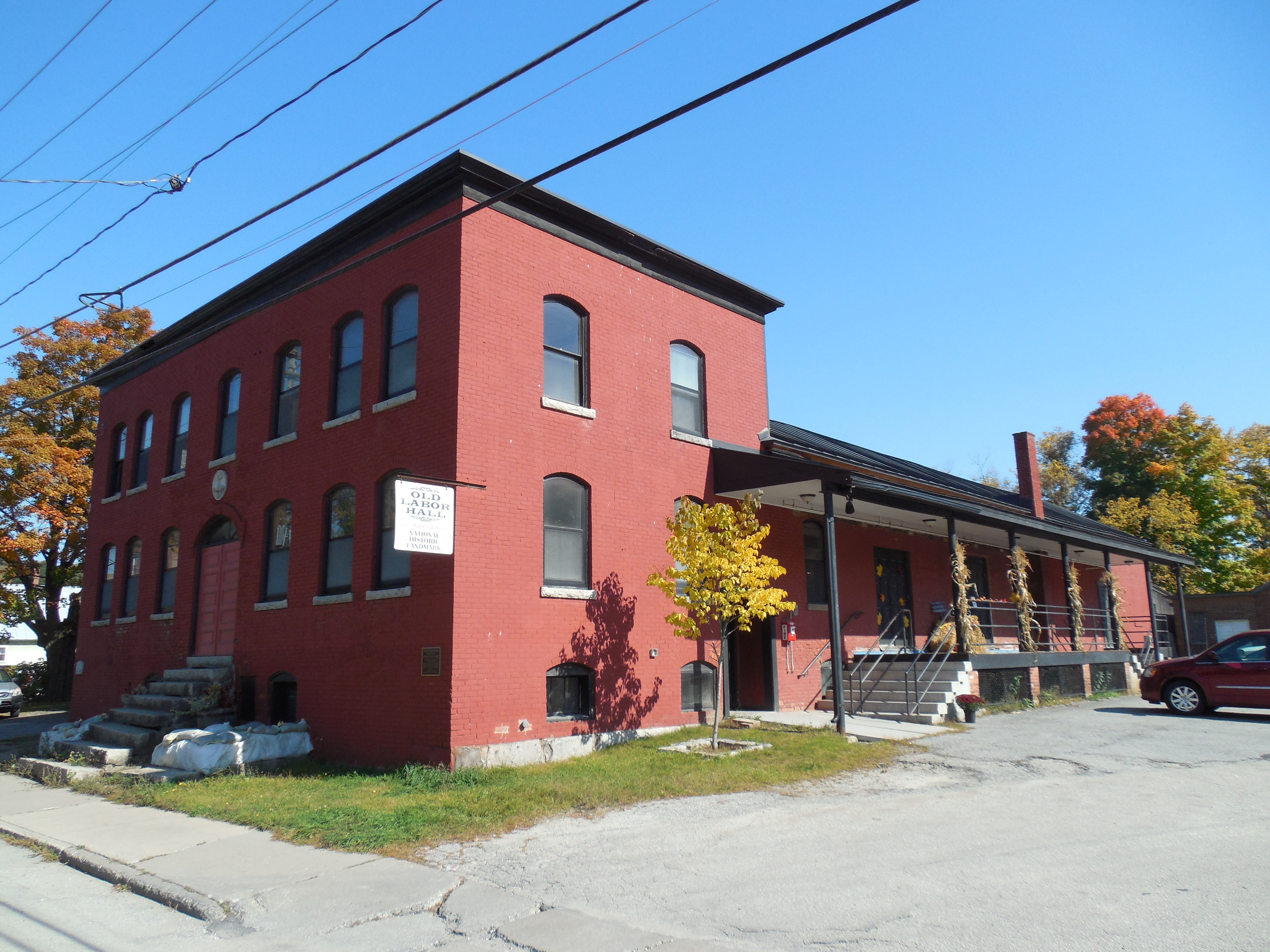
- Socialist Labor Party Hall

- Location within Vermont Location within the United States
- Location: 46 Granite Street, Barre City, Vermont
- Coordinates: 44°11′54.31″N 72°30′26.74″W
- Area: less than one acre
- Built: 1900
- NRHP reference No.: 98001267

Significant dates
- Added to NRHP: October 22, 1998
- Designated NHL: May 16, 2000

The Socialist Labor Party Hall at 46 Granite Street, Barre, Vermont was constructed in 1900. It was a location for debates among anarchists, socialists, and union leaders over the future direction of the labor movement in the United States in the early 20th century.

Located in the former Italian section of Barre, the Socialist Labor Party Hall is a two-story flat-roofed brick structure with a gambrel-roofed single story rear hall. It is associated with Barre's rich ethnic heritage, specifically the vital Italian community that immigrated to Barre at the end of the 19th century.

The direct association of this property with the labor movement, community, and the immigration of Italians makes it one of Barre's most important buildings. It was designated a National Historic Landmark in 2000 for its association with the socialist, anarchist, and labor movements, and as the only building known to have been built by volunteer members of the Socialist Labor Party.

== Architecture ==
Its design reflects no particular architectural style, but its form does illustrate the building's function as an assembly hall. The exterior is simply ornamented with Barre granite details. The most important of these is a carved medallion depicting an arm bearing a hammer, the symbol of the Socialist Labor Party, and the initials SLP.

== History ==
The building was constructed in 1900 by volunteers of the Italian community as a meeting hall for the Socialist Labor Party, a political group dedicated to social and labor reform. The Hall provided the community with a place to meet, organize, and socialize. Dances, boxing and wrestling matches were held here. In 1901, the Co-Operative store was started in the basement to provide necessities for the community.

When the Hall opened in 1900, more than 90 percent of Barre's workers belonged to one of 15 local unions, many of them probably attended union meetings and political rallies held here. From 1900 to 1936 the building held the offices and meetings of the Granite Cutters' International Association, at the time the largest local union of granite workers in the country. Labors leaders such as Eugene Debs and Samuel Gompers are known to have visited Barre and, although unconfirmed, likely spoke at the Hall.

During the infamous 1912 Lawrence textile strike, taking place in Lawrence, Massachusetts, the Italian community in Barre sheltered 35 children of those striking workers, all of whom were received at the Hall. During one political gathering in 1903, illustrating the sometimes volatile nature of political groups at this time, an argument broke out between socialists and anarchists, ending in the essentially random but fatal shooting of Elia Corti, a prominent Italian stone carver responsible for the panels on the Robert Burns Memorial statue in Barre.

In 1936, the Hall was sold and converted to a warehouse for The Washington Fruit Company and later the Vermont Pak Tomato company.

The property was listed on the National Register of Historic Places in 1998, and was designated a National Historic Landmark in 2000.

In 1995 the Hall was purchased by the Barre Historical Society, with much support, to restore it as a library, community meeting hall, and social club. The Labor Hall was flooded due to rain on July 10–11, 2007. Four feet of water flooded the basement, damaging walls, equipment, and the archived documents stored in the basement.

The hall has been used for various social and community projects and functions throughout the years. In 2006, the hall was used for the first rehearsals and performances of the musical Hadestown, which would eventually debut on Broadway in 2019. Hadestown’s writer, Anaïs Mitchell, was raised nearby.

== See also ==
- Socialist Hall, also listed on the National Register of Historic Places
- List of National Historic Landmarks in Vermont
- National Register of Historic Places listings in Washington County, Vermont
