= Socialist Hall =

- U.S. National Register of Historic Places
- U.S. National Historic Landmark District – Contributing property
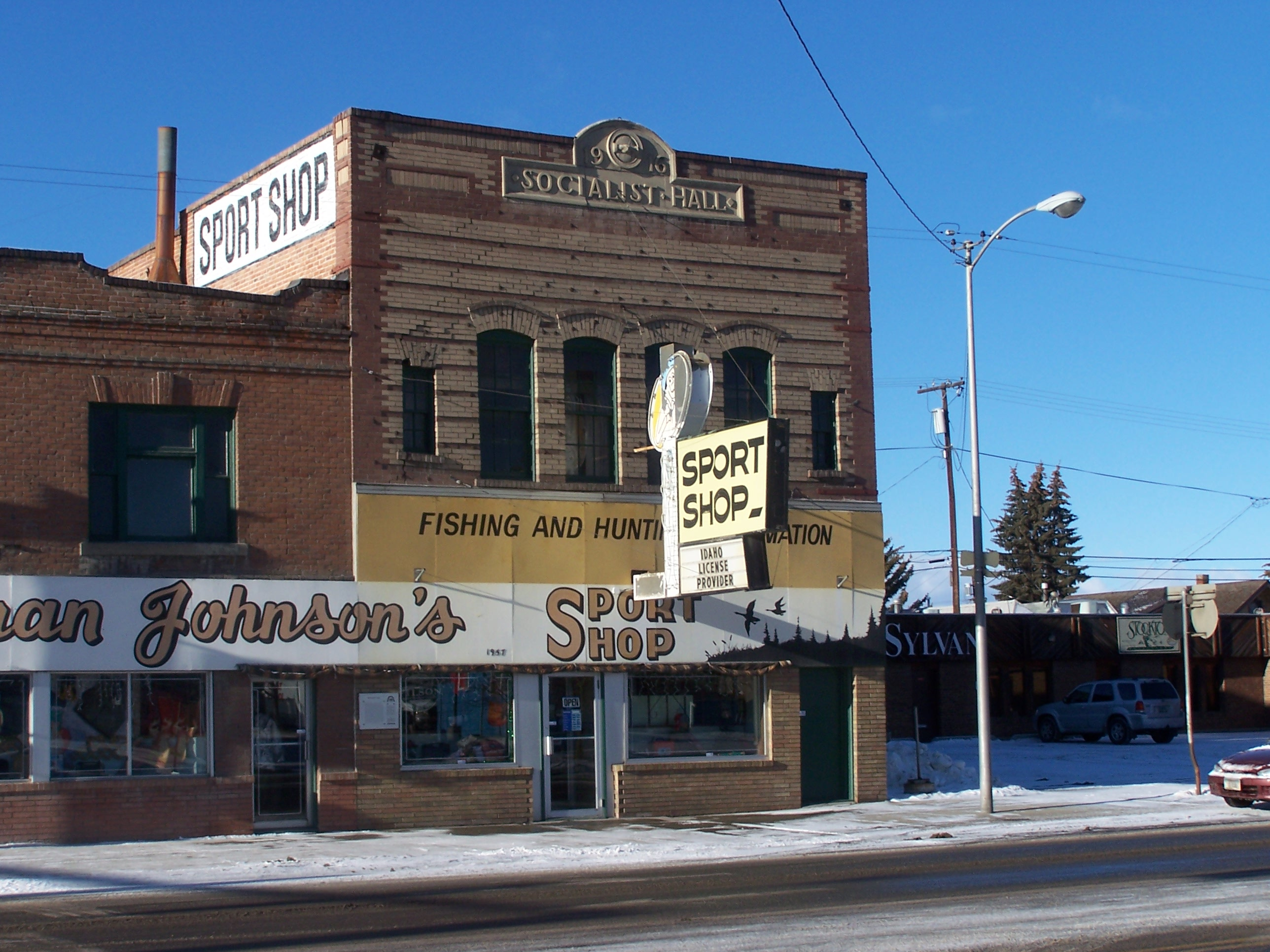
- Socialist Hall, Butte, Montana

- Location within Montana Location within the United States
- Location: 1957 Harrison Ave., Butte, Montana
- Coordinates: 45°59′39″N 112°30′45″W
- Area: less than one acre
- Built: 1916
- Architect: J. Frank Mabie
- Architectural style: Western Commercial
- NRHP reference No.: 95000661
- Added to NRHP: May 26, 1995

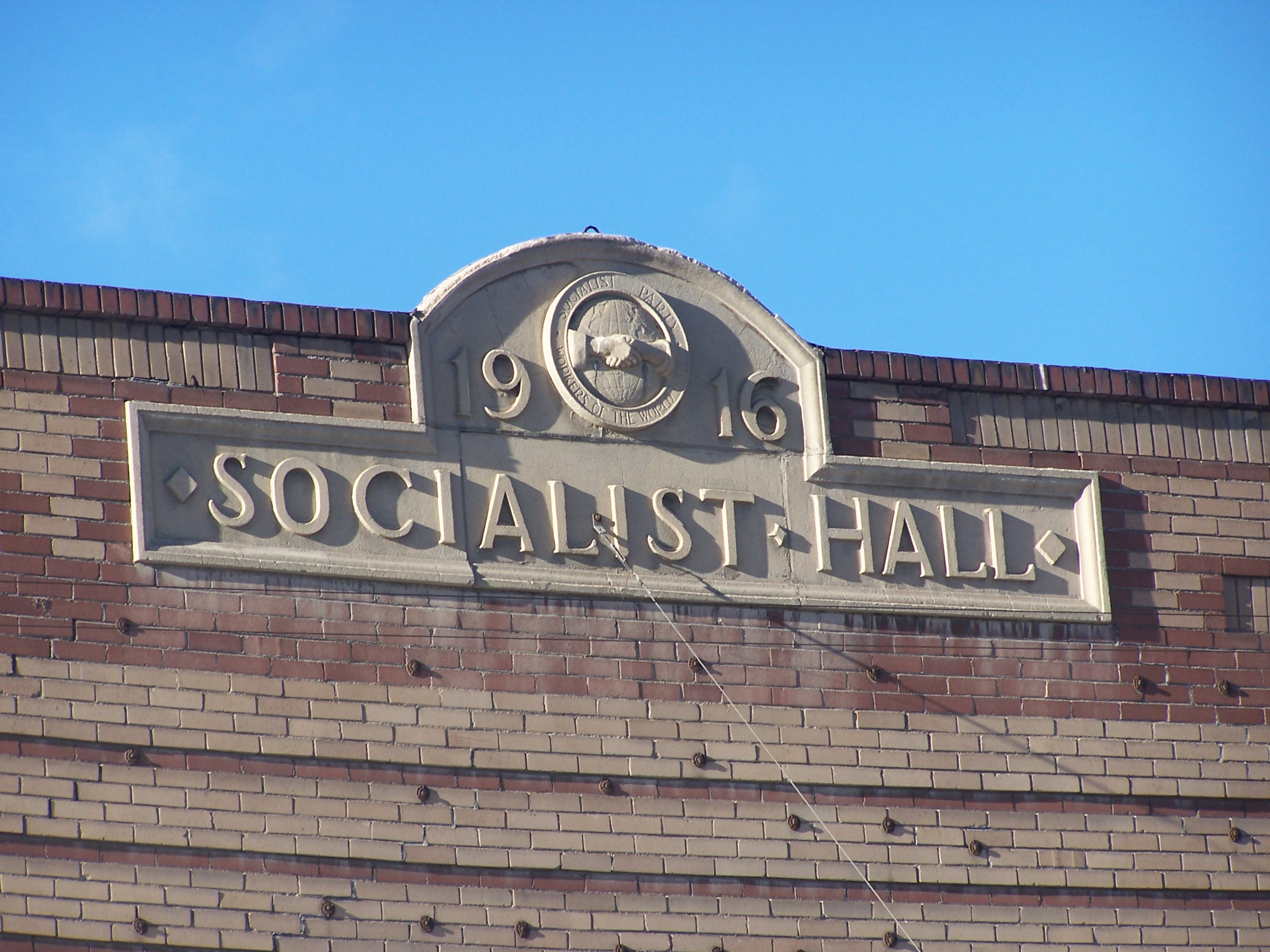
Cornice of the hall

The Socialist Hall in Butte, Montana is one of the few socialist halls remaining in the United States. Erected in 1916, when the Socialist movement was strong in the city, it was active for only a few years until socialism fell out of favor amidst persecution of socialists and labor unionists including the Anaconda Road Massacre and the lynching of Frank Little.

During its brief time of service, the Industrial Workers of the World met here, also holding meetings in Butte's Finlander Hall.

Today a sporting goods shop occupies the first floor of the former Socialist Hall. The building is physically outside the boundaries of the Butte-Anaconda-Walkerville National Historic Landmark District, but is included with it for documentation.

The Socialist Hall building is a two-story building which "is an excellent example of craftsmanship and design in a two-part commercial block style building." It faces east onto Harrison Avenue with a chocolate colored and beige brick facade. When nominated, it had about fifty masonry anchor bolts stabilizing the front facade.

== See also ==
- Socialist Labor Party Hall, also listed on the National Register of Historic Places
- National Register of Historic Places listings in Silver Bow County, Montana
