= Hall =

Large room used for meetings, social affairs or events

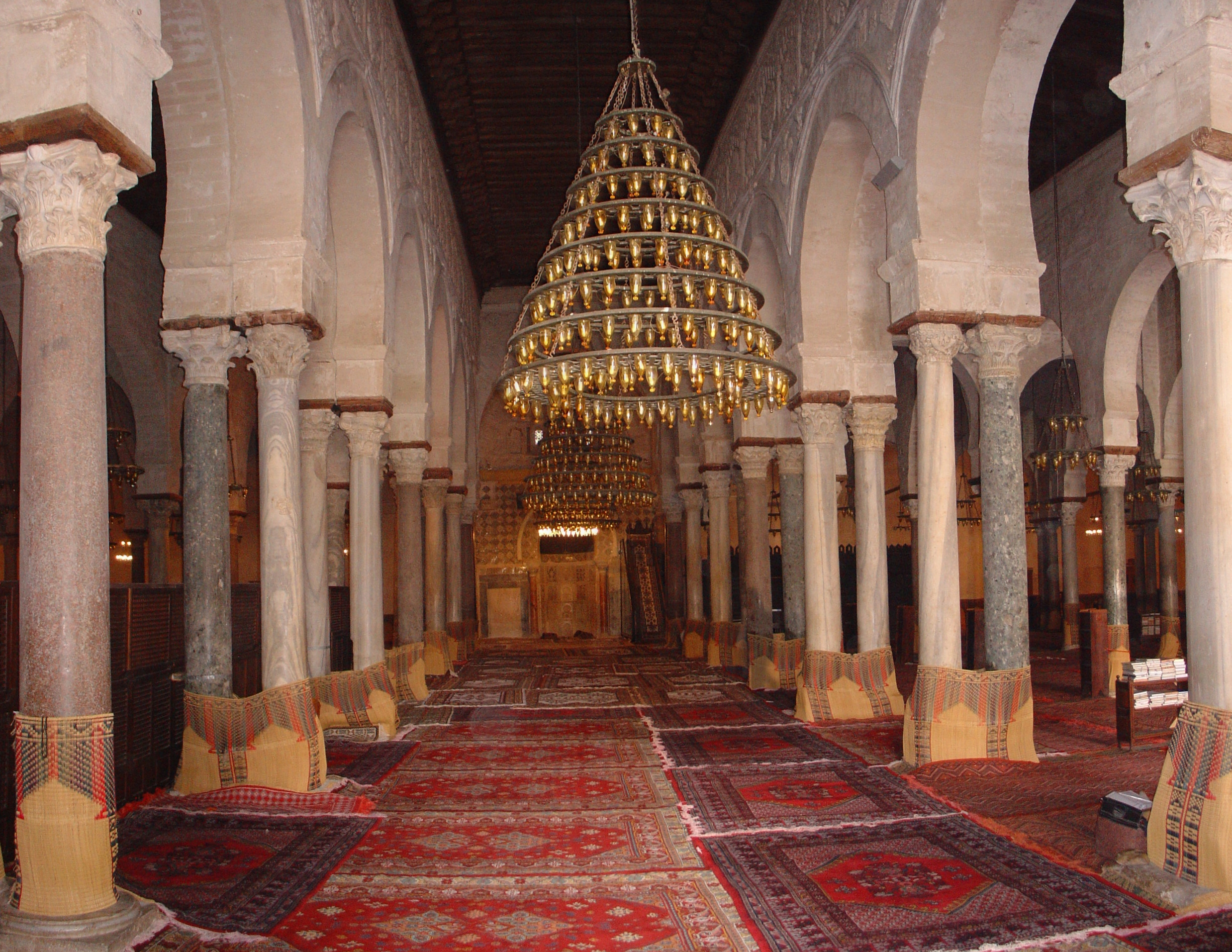
Prayer hall of the Great Mosque of Kairouan, in Kairouan, Tunisia

In architecture, a hall is a relatively large space enclosed by a roof and walls. In the Iron Age and the Early Middle Ages in northern Europe, a mead hall was where a lord and his retainers ate and also slept. Later in the Middle Ages, the great hall was the largest room in castles and large houses, and where the servants usually slept. As more complex house plans developed, the hall remained a large room for dancing and large feasts, often still with servants sleeping there. It was usually immediately inside the main door. In modern British houses, an entrance hall next to the front door remains an indispensable feature, even if it is essentially merely a corridor.

Today, the (entrance) hall of a house is the space next to the front door or vestibule leading to the rooms directly and/or indirectly. Where the hall inside the front door of a house is elongated, it may be called a passage, corridor (from Spanish corredor used in El Escorial and 100 years later in Castle Howard), or hallway.

== History ==
In warmer climates, the houses of the wealthy were often built around a courtyard, but in northern areas manors were built around a great hall. The hall was home to the hearth and was where all the residents of the house would eat, work, and sleep. One common example of this form is the longhouse. Only particularly messy tasks would be done in separate rooms on the periphery of the hall. Still today the term hall is often used to designate a country house such as a hall house, or specifically a Wealden hall house, and manor houses.

In later medieval Europe, the main room of a castle or manor house was the great hall. In a medieval building, the hall was where the fire was kept. As heating technology improved and a desire for privacy grew, tasks moved from the hall to other rooms. First, the master of the house withdrew to private bedrooms and eating areas. Over time servants and children also moved to their own areas, while work projects were also given their own chambers leaving the hall for special functions. With time, its functions as dormitory, kitchen, parlour, and so on were divided into separate rooms or, in the case of the kitchen, a separate building.

Until the early modern era that majority of the population lived in houses with a single room. In the 17th century, even lower classes began to have a second room, with the main chamber being the hall and the secondary room the parlor. The hall and parlor house was found in England and was a fundamental, historical floor plan in parts of the United States from 1620 to 1860.

In Europe, as the wealthy embraced multiple rooms initially the common form was the enfilade, with rooms directly connecting to each other. In 1597 John Thorpe is the first recorded architect to replace multiple connected rooms with rooms along a corridor each accessed by a separate door.

== Other uses ==
=== Collegiate halls ===
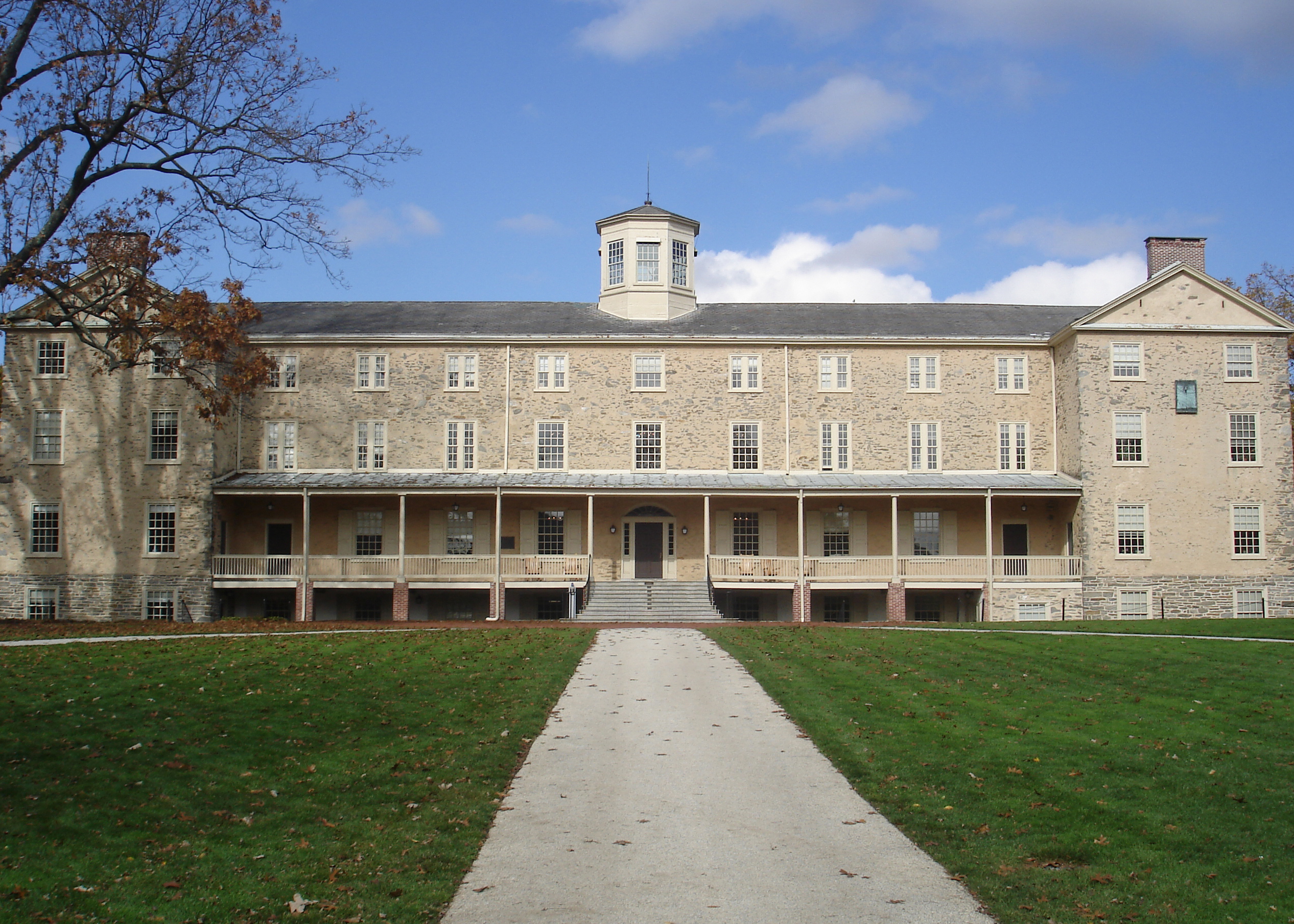
Founders Hall at Haverford College in Pennsylvania

Many institutions and buildings at colleges and universities are formally titled "_______ Hall", typically being named after the person who endowed it, for example, King's Hall, Cambridge. Others, such as Lady Margaret Hall, Oxford, commemorate respected people. Between these in age, Nassau Hall at Princeton University began as the single building of the then college. In medieval origin, these were the halls in which the members of the university lived together during term time. In many cases, some aspect of this community remains.

Some of these institutions are titled "Hall" instead of "College" because at the time of their foundation they were not recognised as colleges (in some cases because their foundation predated the existence of colleges) and did not have the appropriate royal charter. Examples at the University of Oxford are:

- St Edmund Hall
- Hart Hall (now Hertford College)
- Lady Margaret Hall
- The (currently six) Permanent private halls.

In colleges of the universities of Oxford and Cambridge, the term "Hall" is also used for the dining hall for students, with High Table at one end for fellows. Typically, at "Formal Hall", gowns are worn for dinner during the evening, whereas for "informal Hall" they are not. The medieval collegiate dining hall, with a dais for the high table at the upper end and a screen passage at the lower end, is a modified or assimilated form of the Great hall.

=== Meeting hall ===
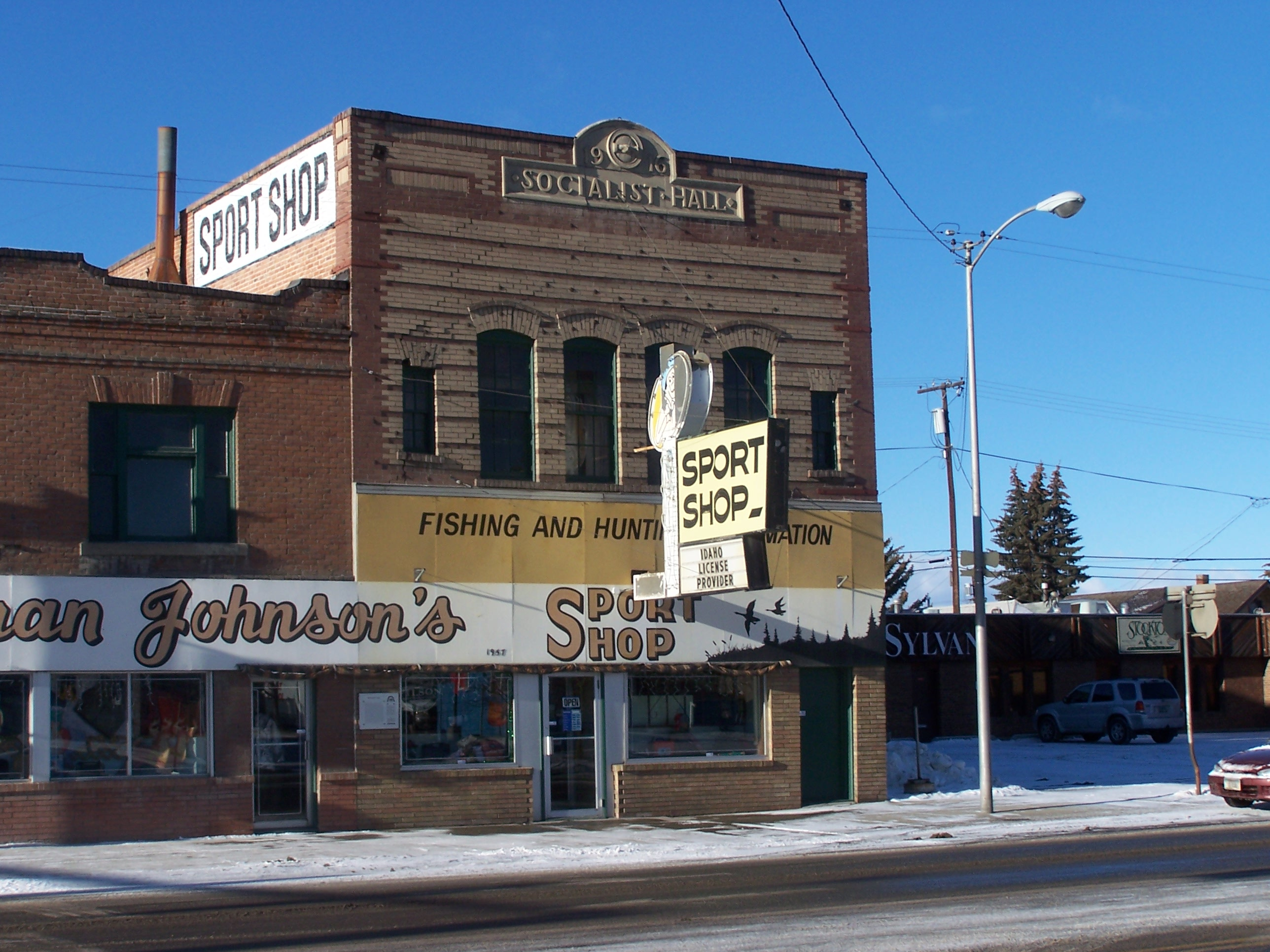
Socialist Hall, a former meeting hall in Butte, Montana

A hall is also a building consisting largely of a principal room, that is rented out for meetings and social affairs. It may be privately or government-owned, such as a function hall owned by one company used for weddings and cotillions (organized and run by the same company on a contractual basis) or a community hall available for rent to anyone, such as a British village hall.

=== Religious halls ===
In religious architecture, as in Islamic architecture, the prayer hall is a large room dedicated to the practice of worship. (example: the prayer hall of the Great Mosque of Kairouan in Tunisia). A hall church is a church with a nave and side aisles of approximately equal height. Many churches have an associated church hall used for meetings and other events.

=== Public buildings ===
Following a line of similar development, in office buildings and larger buildings (theatres, cinemas etc.), the entrance hall is generally known as the foyer (the French for fireplace). The atrium, a name sometimes used in public buildings for the entrance hall, was the central courtyard of a Roman house.

== Types ==
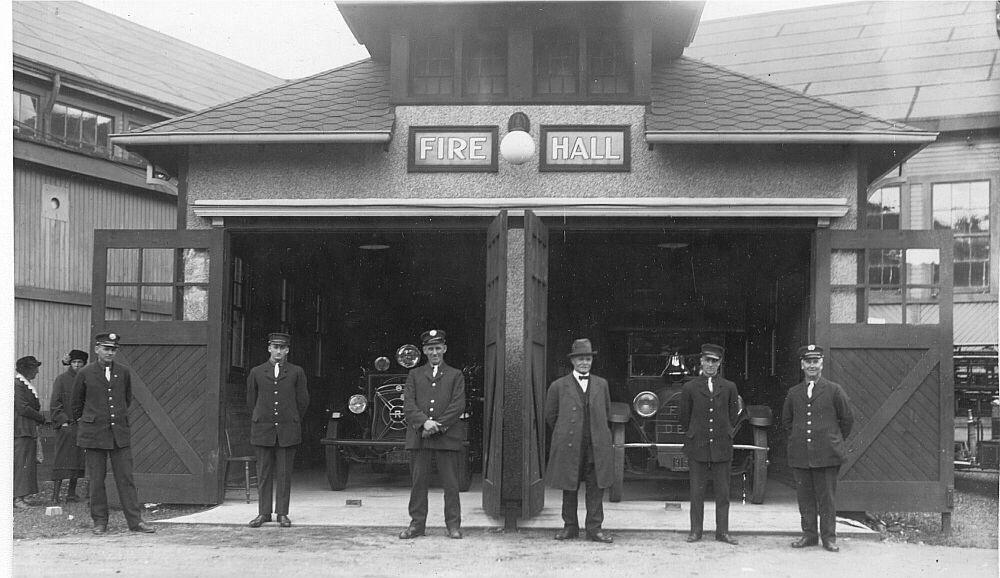
Firehall (London, Ontario) in 1923

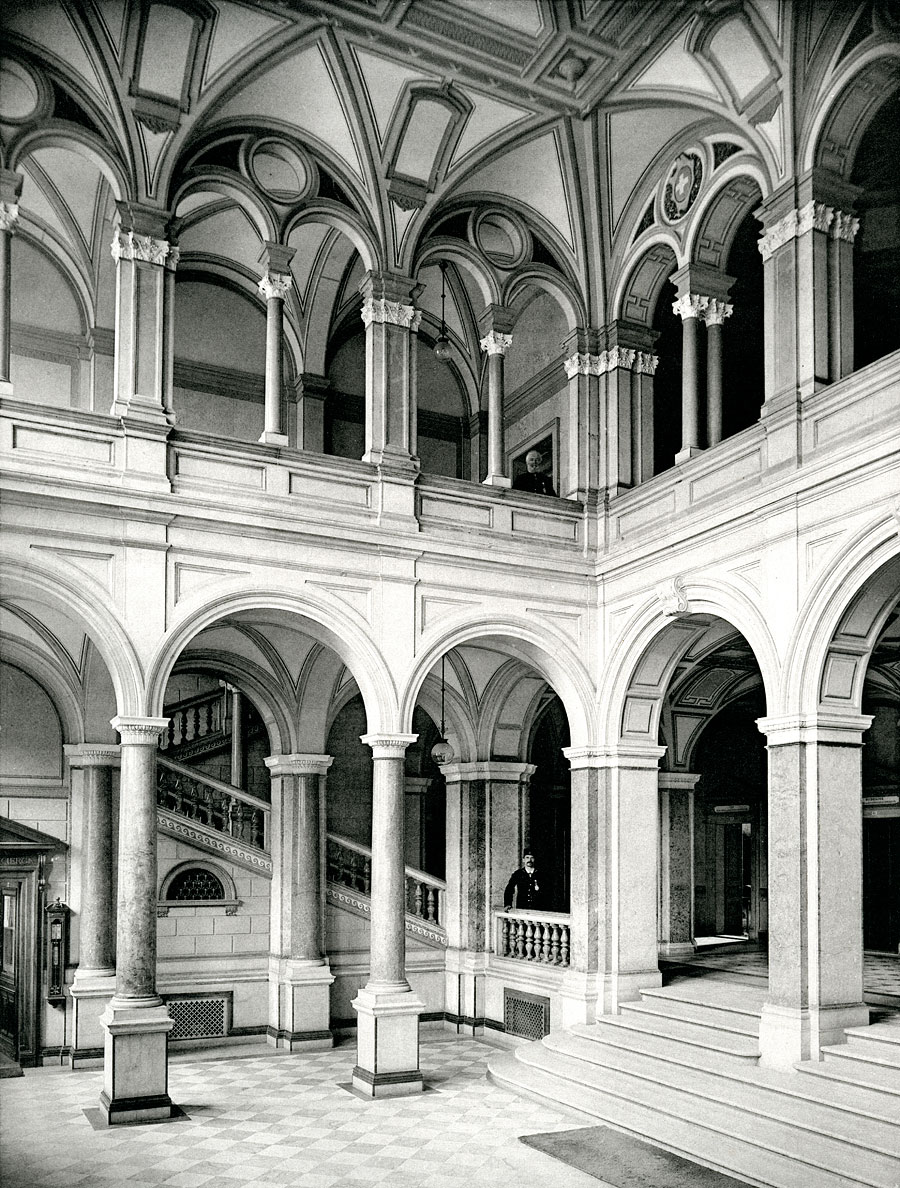
Entry hall of the Federal Palace of Switzerland

In architecture, the term "double-loaded" describes corridors that connect to rooms on both sides. Conversely, a single-loaded corridor only has rooms on one side (and possible windows on the other). A blind corridor does not lead anywhere.

- Billiard hall
- City hall, town hall or village hall
- Concert hall
- Concourse (at a large transportation station)
- Convention center (exhibition hall)
- Dance hall
- Dining hall
- Firehall
- Great room or great hall
- Moot hall
- Prayer hall, such as the sanctuary of a synagogue
- Reading room
- Residence hall
- Trades hall (also called union hall, labour hall, etc.)
- Waiting room (in large transportation stations)

== See also ==
- Hall of fame
