= Butte, Anaconda and Pacific Railway Historic District =

Historic district in Montana, United States

- U.S. National Register of Historic Places
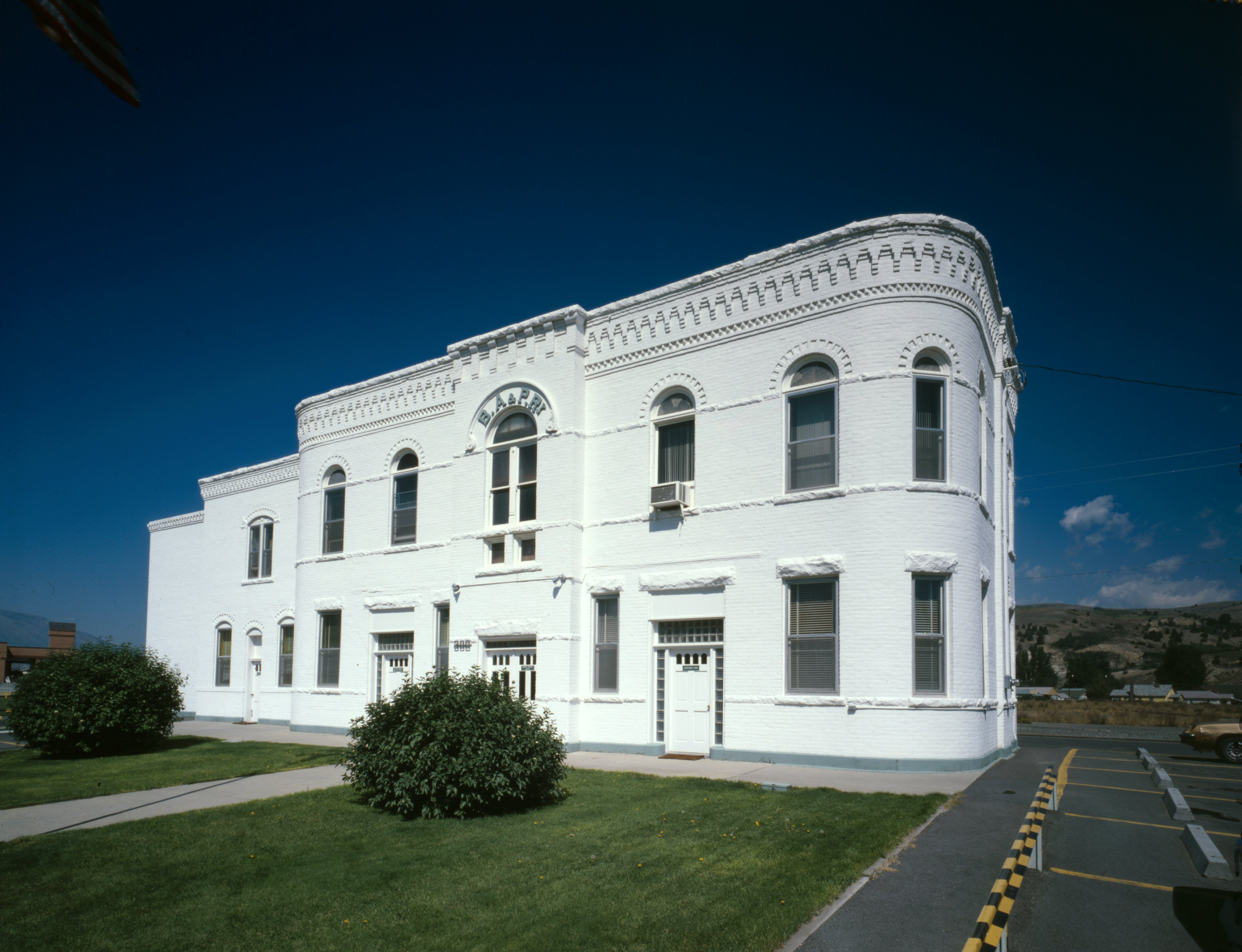
- A headquarters building of the Butte, Anaconda and Pacific Railway

- Location within Montana Location within the United States
- Location: Right-of-way begins in Butte and travels to Anaconda, generally along course of Silver Bow Creek, Butte, Montana
- Coordinates: 46°02′37″N 112°44′25″W
- Area: 750 acres (300 ha) (original); 20 acres (8.1 ha) (increase)
- Built by: Butte, Anaconda and Pacific RR; Et al.
- NRHP reference No.: 88001111 (original); 88003149 (increase)

Significant dates
- Added to NRHP: October 13, 1988
- Boundary increase: January 13, 1989

The Butte, Anaconda and Pacific Railway Historic District is a 750 acres (300 ha) historic district which was listed on the National Register of Historic Places in 1988. It covers the railway right-of-way which begins in Butte, Montana and runs to Anaconda generally along the course of Silver Bow Creek. It spans parts of Deer Lodge and Silver Bow counties. The listing included 51 contributing buildings, 34 contributing structures, and two contributing sites.

It covers resources associated with the Butte, Anaconda and Pacific Railway.

A Butte, Anaconda and Pacific Railway Historic District (Boundary Increase) added some Western rustic architecture in or near Durant, Montana. The boundary increase added eight contributing buildings on 20 acres (8.1 ha) at the confluence of German Gulch and Silver Bow Creek at the east end of Silver Bow Canyon.

The district may have been incorporated into the huge Butte-Anaconda Historic District when that district was expanded in 2006.
