= 1928 United States Senate election in Montana =

- November 6, 1928
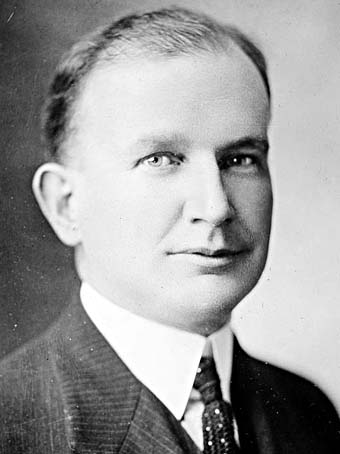

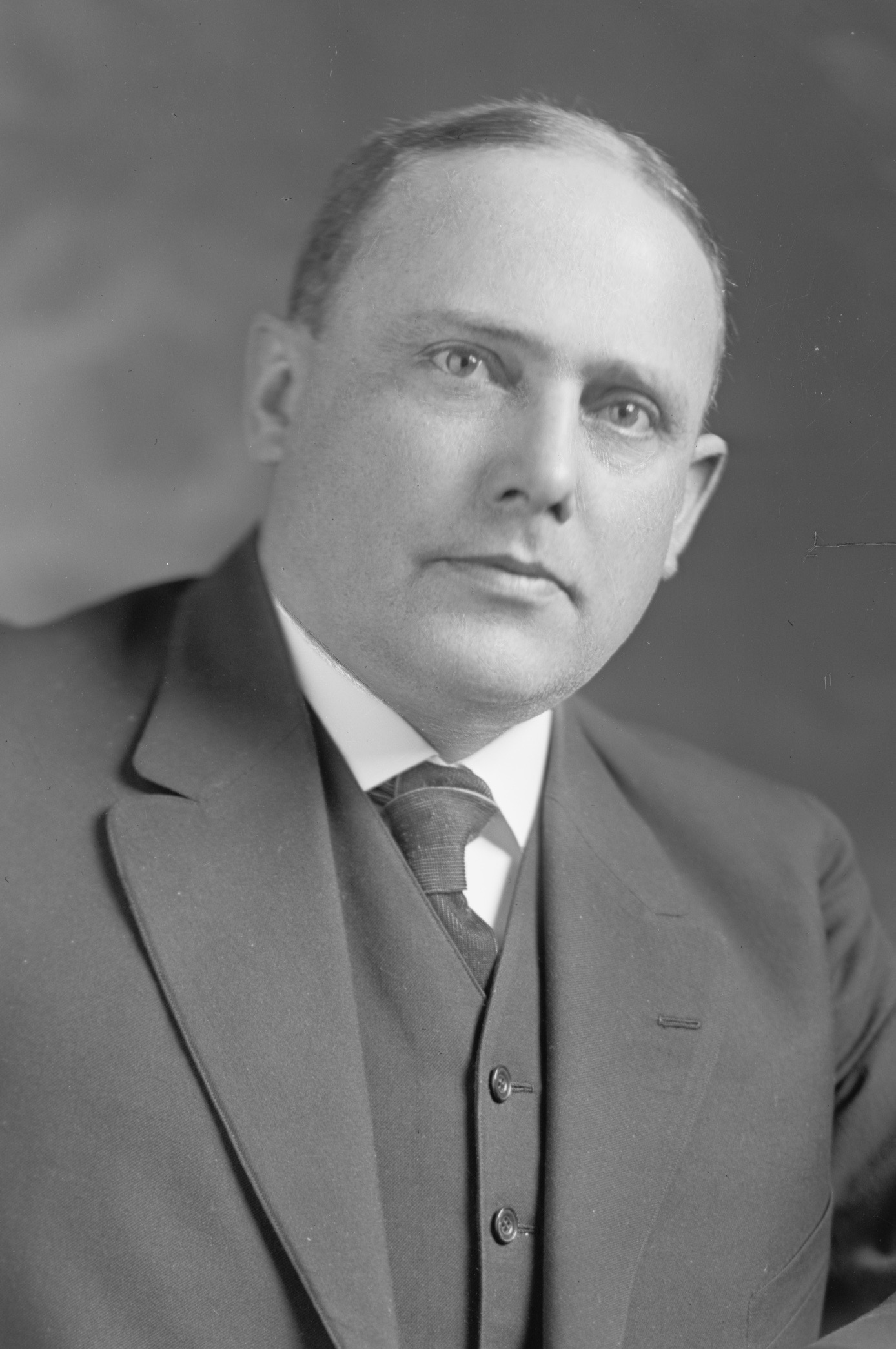
Nominee	Burton K. Wheeler	Joseph M. Dixon
Party	Democratic	Republican
Popular vote	103,655	91,185
Percentage	53.20%	46.80%
- County results Wheeler: 50–60% 60–70% 70–80% Dixon: 50–60% 60–70%
U.S. senator before election
Burton K. Wheeler
Democratic
Elected U.S. Senator
Burton K. Wheeler
Democratic

The 1928 United States Senate election in Montana took place on November 6, 1928. Incumbent United States Senator Burton K. Wheeler, who was first elected to the Senate in 1922, ran for re-election. After defeating several challengers in the Democratic primary, Wheeler advanced to the general election, where he faced Republican nominee Joseph M. Dixon, the former Governor of Montana who had previously served in the United States Senate from 1907 to 1913. Though the election was closer than Wheeler's first election, he still managed to defeat Dixon to win his second term in the Senate.

== Democratic primary ==
=== Candidates ===
- Burton K. Wheeler, incumbent United States Senator
- Sam V. Stewart, former Governor of Montana
- Sam W. Teagarden, independent candidate for the United States in 1924

=== Results ===
Democratic Party primary results
Party	Candidate	Votes	%
Democratic	Burton K. Wheeler (inc.)	37,515	75.51
Democratic	Sam V. Stewart	10,256	20.64
Democratic	Sam W. Teagarden	1,911	3.85
Total votes		49,682	100.00

== Republican primary ==
=== Candidates ===
- Joseph M. Dixon, former Governor of Montana, former United States Senator, former United States Congressman from Montana's at-large congressional district
- Charles H. Williams, former State Senator
- Charles F. Juttner, 1924 Socialist Party nominee for the United States Senate

=== Results ===
Republican Primary results
Party	Candidate	Votes	%
Republican	Joseph M. Dixon	38,747	57.30
Republican	Charles H. Williams	26,409	39.06
Republican	Charles F. Juttner	2,462	3.64
Total votes		67,618	100.00

== General election ==
=== Results ===
United States Senate election in Montana, 1928
Party	Candidate	Votes	%	±%
Democratic	Burton K. Wheeler (inc.)	103,655	53.20%	−2.36%
Republican	Joseph M. Dixon	91,185	46.80%	+3.03%
Majority		12,470	6.40%	−5.39%
Turnout		194,840		
Democratic hold		Swing		
