= 1922 United States Senate election in Montana =

- November 7, 1922
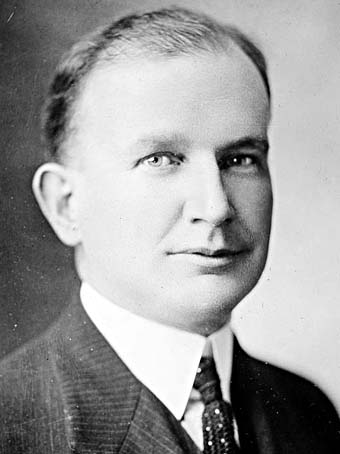

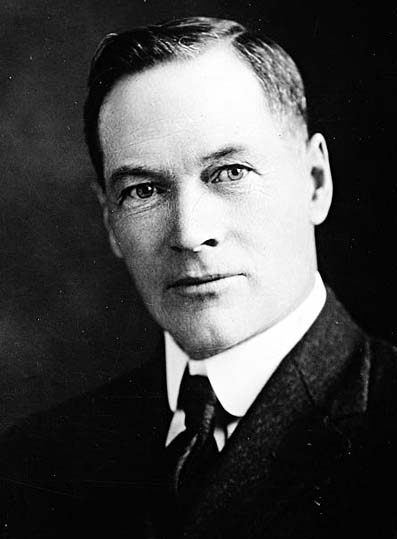
Nominee	Burton K. Wheeler	Carl W. Riddick
Party	Democratic	Republican
Popular vote	88,205	69,494
Percentage	55.56%	43.77%
- County results Wheeler: 50–60% 60–70% 70–80% Riddick: 40–50% 50–60% 60–70% 70–80%
U.S. senator before election
Henry L. Myers
Democratic
Elected U.S. Senator
Burton K. Wheeler
Democratic

The 1922 United States Senate election in Montana took place on November 7, 1922. Incumbent United States senator Henry L. Myers, who was first elected to the Senate in 1910, and was re-elected in 1916, declined to seek re-election. Former United States Attorney Burton K. Wheeler won the Democratic primary and advanced to the general election, where he faced Carl W. Riddick, the United States Congressman from Montana's 2nd congressional district and the Republican nominee. Ultimately, Wheeler defeated Riddick comfortably and won his first term in the Senate.

== Democratic primary ==
=== Candidates ===
- Burton K. Wheeler, 1920 Democratic nominee for Governor of Montana, former United States Attorney for the District of Montana, former State Representative
- Tom Stout, former United States Congressman from Montana's at-large congressional district
- James F. O'Connor, former Speaker of the Montana House of Representatives
- Hugh R. Wells, former State Representative, former chairman of the Montana Democratic Party

=== Results ===
Democratic Party primary results
Party	Candidate	Votes	%
Democratic	Burton K. Wheeler	20,914	54.66
Democratic	Tom Stout	6,550	17.12
Democratic	James F. O'Connor	6,296	16.46
Democratic	Hugh R. Wells	4,500	11.76
Total votes		38,260	100.00

== Republican primary ==
=== Candidates ===
- Carl W. Riddick, United States Congressman from Montana's 2nd congressional district
- Wellington D. Rankin, Attorney General of Montana
- Charles Nelson Pray, former United States Congressman from Montana's at-large congressional district, 1916 Republican nominee for the United States Senate
- J. W. Anderson
- J. C. F. Siegfriedt, mining company doctor

=== Results ===
Republican Primary results
Party	Candidate	Votes	%
Republican	Carl W. Riddick	23,334	33.15
Republican	Wellington D. Rankin	18,704	26.57
Republican	Charles Nelson Pray	11,911	16.92
Republican	J. W. Anderson	10,487	14.90
Republican	J. C. F. Siegfriedt	5,947	8.45
Total votes		70,383	100.00

== General election ==
=== Results ===
United States Senate election in Montana, 1922
Party	Candidate	Votes	%	±%
Democratic	Burton K. Wheeler	88,205	55.56%	+4.50%
Republican	Carl W. Riddick	69,494	43.77%	+0.37%
Socialist	George H. Ambrose	1,068	0.67%	−4.87%
Majority		18,711	11.79%	+4.13%
Turnout		158,767		
Democratic hold		Swing		

United States Senate Election in Montana, 1922 - Results by County
County	Wheeler	Riddick	Ambrose
Beaverhead	1,208	1,326	7
Big Horn	628	752	4
Blaine	919	1,139	4
Broadwater	892	482	10
Carbon	2,089	1,715	43
Carter	228	594	14
Cascade	6,162	4,018	56
Chouteau	1,699	1,577	16
Custer	1,763	1,708	20
Daniels	728	528	14
Dawson	1,262	1,314	11
Deer Lodge	3,536	1,541	17
Fallon	472	772	3
Fergus	3,697	3,291	24
Flathead	3,375	2,441	68
Gallatin	2,990	2,486	25
Garfield	726	988	21
Glacier	720	549	7
Golden Valley	476	562	7
Granite	814	577	10
Hill	2,085	1,399	14
Jefferson	1,069	683	9
Judith Basin	1,189	920	10
Lewis & Clark	3,580	2,572	19
Liberty	460	448	4
Lincoln	979	877	58
Madison	1,258	1,060	10
McCone	633	650	15
Meagher	357	505	4
Mineral	761	179	16
Missoula	5,331	2,419	48
Musselshell	1,512	1,126	33
Park	1,842	1,620	29
Phillips	950	1,634	13
Pondera	1,130	853	11
Powder River	315	690	6
Powell	1,475	749	8
Prairie	438	659	4
Ravalli	1,803	1,272	21
Richland	921	1,099	8
Rosebud	1,108	1,114	9
Roosevelt	1,495	1,876	23
Sanders	1,203	698	35
Sheridan	1,384	920	25
Silver Bow	11,218	4,771	641
Stillwater	777	1,091	8
Sweet Grass	451	762	2
Teton	951	1,035	8
Toole	813	714	9
Treasure	209	386	5
Valley	1,512	1,572	25
Wheatland	828	845	5
Wibaux	241	630	4
Yellowstone	3,542	3,276	25
