= Joseph Gelders =

American physicist and activist (1898–1950)

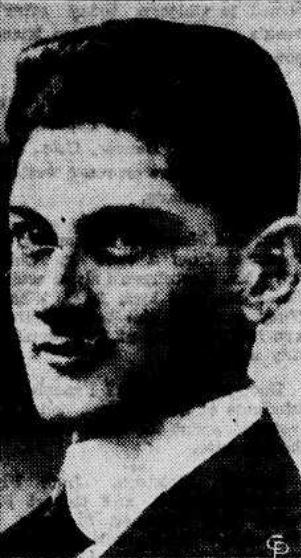
- Gelders in 1936
- Born: November 20, 1898; Birmingham, Alabama, US
- Died: March 1, 1950 (aged 51); San Francisco, California, US
- Education: University of Alabama
- Occupations: Physicist, antiracist, civil rights activist, labor organizer, communist
- Organizations: Southern Conference for Human Welfare; National Committee to Abolish the Poll Tax
- Movement: Civil rights movement; Women's poll tax repeal movement
- Children: Blanche Hartman; Marge Frantz
- Relatives: Emma Gelders Sterne (sister); Nina Hartley (granddaughter)

Joseph Sidney Gelders (November 20, 1898 – March 1, 1950) was an American physicist who later became an antiracist, civil rights activist, labor organizer, and communist. In the mid-1930s, he served as the secretary and southern-U.S. representative of the National Committee for the Defense of Political Prisoners. In September 1936, Gelders was kidnapped, beaten, and nearly killed by members of the Ku Klux Klan for his civil rights and labor organizing activities. After his recovery, Gelders continued his activism and cofounded the Southern Conference for Human Welfare and the National Committee to Abolish the Poll Tax. He collaborated closely with other activists including Lucy Randolph Mason and Virginia Foster Durr. Internal injuries sustained during his kidnapping and assault led to Gelders' death on March 1, 1950.

== Early life and education ==
Gelders was born November 20, 1898, in Birmingham, Alabama, to a family of German-Jewish descent. He was the son of Blanche Loeb, of Mississippi, and Louis Gelders, a restaurateur and real estate businessperson. His elder sister was author Emma Gelders Sterne, and his brother, Louis Gelders Jr., was a New York architect. Gelders attended the University of Alabama for a year and a half before attending the Massachusetts Institute of Technology for a year. Gelders went back to Birmingham and joined the American Legion. He worked at several jobs including "third helper in an open-hearth furnace of the Tennessee Coal, Iron and Railroad Company." Gelders tried to operate an automobile dealership without success. In 1929, he returned to the University of Alabama and completed a bachelor's and master's degree. After graduating in 1930, Gelders worked at the university as an assistant professor of physics for five years and was also head of the physics laboratory.

== Activism ==
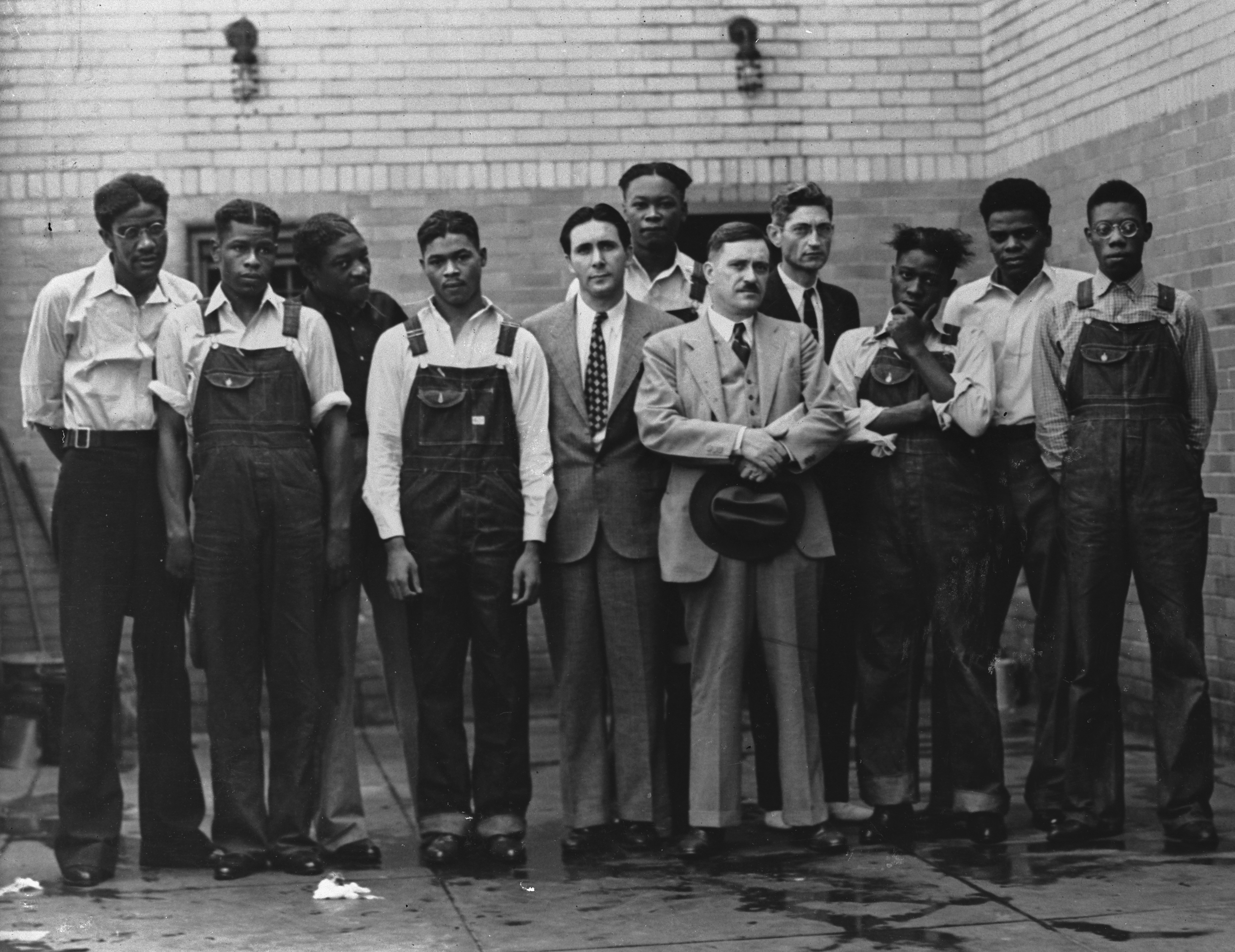
Gelders (fifth from left) with Communist Party functionary Earl Browder (seventh from left) and the Scottsboro Boys, 1931

While working at the University of Alabama, Gelders became more aware of oppressive anti-labor actions. Interested in labor organizing, he joined the Communist Party during the Great Depression. The catalyst for his civil rights activism and labor organizing efforts was a 1934 ore-miner strike which led to the death of several black miners. Gelders and his wife Esther started hosting a weekly discussion group for students. In 1935, he assisted students in drafting a petition against a state anti-sedition bill. In May 1935, Gelders attended a southern conference on civil liberties hosted by left-wing groups in Monteagle, Tennessee. He was moved by the stories of communists, including Blaine Owen, about beatings and illegal raids. In August 1935, he joined the National Committee for the Defense of Political Prisoners (NCDPP). In fall 1935, Gelders resigned from the University of Alabama to pursue civil liberties advocacy fulltime. He moved to New York City to serve as secretary of the NCDPP. He established an Alabama committee to work on the Scottsboro Boys case. Gelders also investigated civil liberties denial at the RCA Corporation in New Jersey. In the summer of 1936, Gelders worked for the release of Communist Party organizer Jack Barton, who had been sentenced to 180 days in jail for being in possession of "communistic literature." In August 1936, he became the southern representative for the CDPP.

=== Kidnapping and assault ===
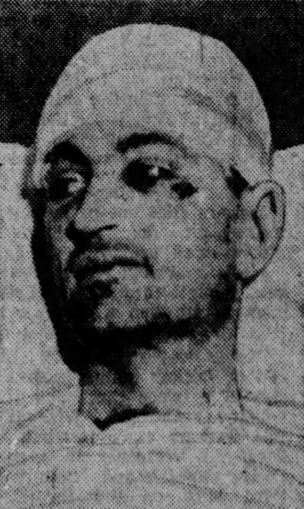
Gelders recovering in a Clayton, Alabama, hospital

At 11:30 pm on September 23, 1936, Gelders was on his way home from an International Labor Defense (ILD) meeting when he was kidnapped on a Birmingham street and flogged with a leather strap. The abductors read and mocked Gelders's Scottsboro Boys–related documents, calling him a "dammed red" and "nigger lover." After a national outcry, Alabama Governor Bibb Graves, who had connections with the Ku Klux Klan, ordered a state police investigation and authorized a $200 reward (equivalent to US$4,640 in 2025). Police found four suspects, three of whom Gelders positively identified. One was an employee of the Tennessee Coal, Iron and Railroad Company. Some accounts state that they were members of the Ku Klux Klan. Despite an additional investigation by the La Follette Committee, no indictments were filed. In a private letter to the governor, the chief detective, G. C. Giles, remarked that the economic considerations would prevent convictions.

=== Continued activism ===
In the spring of 1938, Gelders went to Hyde Park, New York, to discuss his idea for the Southern Conference for Human Welfare (SCHW) with U.S. First Lady Eleanor Roosevelt and U.S. President Franklin D. Roosevelt. With their support, the conference was open to people of all races and covered topics including social justice, electoral reforms, and improving race relations. Lobbyist Lucy Randolph Mason cofounded the SCHW and played a large role in its development. Gelders also obtained the support of William Mitch, the President of District 20 of the United Mine Workers, and the Alabama Director of the Congress of Industrial Organizations (CIO). Eleanor Roosevelt attended the first SCHW on November 20, 1938. A continuing organization was established as an outcome of this conference, and Gelders was designated executive secretary of the Civil Rights Committee. In this role, he targeted poll taxes in the United States.

Gelders and civil rights activist Virginia Foster Durr were prominent figures in the women's poll tax repeal movement, which brought widespread attention to the voter suppression caused by poll taxes. In 1941, Gelders and Durr led the creation of the National Committee to Abolish the Poll Tax (NCAPT). Durr and Gelders's diverse backgrounds proved effective. Gelders's experience in union organizing in the steel industry complemented Durr's network. She was a model of southern femininity and a member of a prominent family. Durr, Gelders, and their circle of southerners who supported New Deal liberalism believed that abolition of the poll tax was a necessary step in reshaping the Democratic Party in the South and defeating the conservative oligarchy of large planters and industrialists that kept most southern citizens disenfranchised and impoverished.

== Military career ==
On July 2, 1918, Gelders enlisted in the U.S. Army during World War I at Fort Oglethorpe, Georgia. He served in Coast Artillery Corps, First Company, in Mobile, Alabama, until transferring on October 1, 1918, to Fort Monroe for school. Gelders was promoted to corporal in September 1918. He was honorably discharged on November 25, 1918. Gelders never saw action, as the war had ended. During World War II, Gelders reenlisted on March 30, 1942, as a technical sergeant in the Western Signal Corps, at Camp Kohler. He was honorably discharged on July 24, 1944.

== Personal life ==
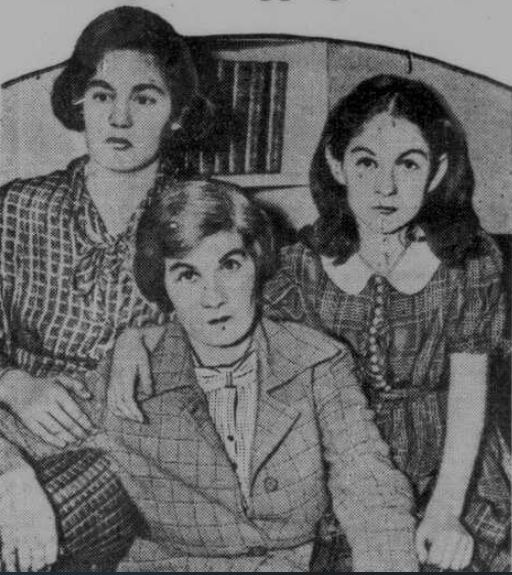
Esther Josephine (née Frank) Gelders and daughters c. 1936

Gelders married Esther Josephine Frank on November 19, 1919, at the Standard Club in Montgomery, Alabama. She worked as an official for the National Youth Administration. They had two daughters. Their older daughter, Marge Frantz, was an activist, feminist, and among the first generation of academics who taught women's studies courses in the United States. Gelders's younger daughter, Blanche Hartman, was a Sōtō teacher. The internal injuries that Gelders sustained from his kidnapping and beating in 1936 eventually led to his death on March 1, 1950, in San Francisco. He was interred on March 7, 1950, at the Golden Gate National Cemetery.

== See also ==
- Jews in the civil rights movement
