= Marge Frantz =

American activist and women's studies academic (1922–2015)

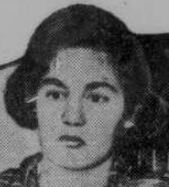
- Frantz in 1936
- Born: Margaret Louise Gelders; June 18, 1922; Birmingham, Alabama
- Died: October 16, 2015 (aged 93); Santa Cruz, California
- Other names: Margie Gelders, Margaret Gelders Frantz
- Occupations: activist, academic
- Years active: 1937–1999
- Father: Joseph Gelders
- Relatives: Blanche Hartman (sister); Emma Gelders Sterne (aunt); Nina Hartley (niece)

Marge Frantz (née Gelders; June 18, 1922 – October 16, 2015) was an American activist and among the first generation of academics who taught women's study courses in the United States. Born in Birmingham, Alabama, from a young age she became involved in progressive causes. She worked as a labor organizer, agitated for civil rights, and participated in the women's poll tax repeal movement. After working as an organizer for the Mine, Mill and Smelter Workers Union in 1944, she was employed full time at the Southern Conference for Human Welfare in Nashville, as a secretary and editor of the organization's press organ, Southern Patriot. By the late 1940s, she was being investigated by the House Un-American Activities Committee and in 1950, she and her husband moved to the San Francisco Bay Area.

Still active in the radical community, Frantz was involved in anti-nuclear testing protests, and supported clemency for convicted spies, Julius and Ethel Rosenberg. From 1957, she worked as an executive secretary at the University of California, Berkeley, but after violence was used against student protesters at People's Park in 1969, she left her job and enrolled as a student. She completed a bachelor's degree in political theory in 1972 and the following year, moved to the University of California, Santa Cruz to work on her PhD. Frantz and her husband each changed romantic partners when she moved to Santa Cruz, Eleanor Engstrand becoming her new companion. At UC Santa Cruz, Frantz was one of the founders of the Women's Studies Department; she served on the Women's Studies Executive Committee and was a member of the Board of Directors of the Women's Center. She taught there from 1973 to 1999 and received two teaching awards. Her life of activism was featured in the 1983 documentary film, Seeing Red.

== Early life and education ==
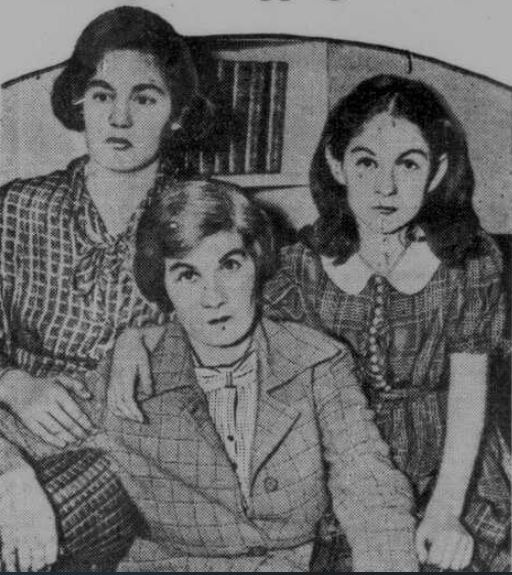
l-r: Margie, her mother Esther Josephine, and her sister, Blanche Gelders, 1936

Margaret Louise "Margie" Gelders was born on June 18, 1922, in Birmingham, Alabama, to Esther Josephine (née Frank) and Joseph Gelders. Her father taught physics at the University of Alabama and became involved in the Communist Party, labor organizing and the struggle for racial justice in the South.

As a "red diaper baby", Gelders was politically active from a young age. When she turned 13, she joined the Young Communist League and traveled with her father supporting leftist causes. During her adolescence, she participated in protest marches and attended rallies to repeal the poll tax as a prerequisite to voting. After her father's near fatal beating for his civil rights work at the hands of vigilantes in 1936, she appreciated the dangers of being an activist but was not dissuaded from following in her father's footsteps. After graduating in Birmingham from Phillips High School in 1938, she spent the next two years studying at Radcliffe College.

While in college, Gelders worked for the Massachusetts chapter of the League of Women Voters. At a rally protesting the arrest in 1940 of George Harris (vice president of the Alabama branch of the Farmer's Union), she and her father were arrested in Birmingham. She was featured that year in a photograph published in the Daily Worker; it showed her participating in a Chicago march advocating for the abolition of poll taxes. She took part in protests by organizations including the American Peace Mobilization, American Youth Congress, League of Young Southerners, Southern Negro Youth Congress, Congress of Industrial Organizations (CIO), and the Southern Conference for Human Welfare, an organization committed to social and political reform of the South. In 1940, she left Radcliffe when she lost her scholarship, which she believed was a result of her radical activities.

== Early career and activism (1941–1972) ==
In 1941, Gelders married Laurent Brown Frantz, a native of Knoxville, Tennessee, who was also a member of the Communist Party and an activist in the League of Young Southerners and anti-poll tax efforts. That year, she took a job at the National Youth Administration's printing office in Birmingham and also worked at the Southern Conference for Human Welfare. In December, she moved to Washington, D.C., to work at the Board of Economic Warfare, a governmental agency which procured imports for production of products for both the civilian economy and the war effort. Her husband joined the United States Navy and in May 1942, Frantz took a post at the Soviet Purchasing Commission, an organization designed to deliver American equipment to the USSR for the war effort. In 1943, she worked for the CIO affiliate, the Mine, Mill and Smelter Workers Union in Birmingham and then in 1944 began working full time at the Southern Conference for Human Welfare in Nashville.

From 1944 to 1946, Frantz served as secretary to James Dombrowski, the executive secretary of the Southern Conference for Human Welfare, and as editor of the Southern Patriot, the official journal of the organization. As early as 1947, Dombrowski, Frantz and her father were investigated by the House Un-American Activities Committee. After being targeted by the Ku Klux Klan, Frantz and her husband left Nashville in 1950 and moved to Berkeley, California. They became part of the local radical community, settled in the San Francisco Bay Area and raised their four children: Joe, Larry, Virginia, and Alex. In the 1950s, Frantz served as the Alameda County director of the Independent Progressive Party. She was a supporter of the Highlander Training and Education Center and became a member of the Northern California Committee against Nuclear Testing. She supported clemency for convicted atomic spies Julius and Ethel Rosenberg, and was in favor of repealing the Smith Act—which allowed for registration and deportation of any member of an organization deemed a threat to the U.S.—and of stopping the prosecutions of those who opposed the Act.

In 1955, Frantz met her life partner Eleanor Engstrand. The two women connected based on common interest in politics, social issues, backpacking, and bird watching. Engstrand was a young mother with two children, a Quaker, and had been a librarian at University of California, Berkeley since 1950. As they grew closer, the two women had lunch together regularly each week. In 1956, Frantz quit the Communist Party, because of Stalin's repression of dissidents. In 1957, she became the executive secretary to Earl F. Cheit, who was in charge of the Institution of Industrial Relations on the campus of UC Berkeley. In 1965, when Cheit was named to a new post as executive assistant chancellor, he appointed her to continue as his executive assistant. The appointment was questioned by the California State Senate's Un-American Activities Committee, which Cheit dismissed as irrelevant given her prior tenure at the university.

In 1961, on a camping trip, Frantz and Engstrand fell in love and their lives and families became entwined. Engstrand's husband died in 1967 and Frantz quit her job in 1969 after university police used violence against student protesters in People's Park. Looking for something to replace her commitment to the Communist Party, she attended classes offered by John Schaar and Sheldon Wolin on political theory and decided to formally enroll at UC Berkeley in 1970. She completed her bachelor's degree with distinction in 1972 and started working on her PhD. Around that time she moved to Ben Lomond, California, with Engstrand who left her job at the UC library. Frantz's husband began a relationship in Palo Alto with Miriam Patchen, widow of poet Kenneth Patchen, who had died in 1972.

== Return to school and later career (1973–1999) ==
Frantz and Engstand's relocation was precipitated by Schaar and Wolin moving to the University of California, Santa Cruz in 1973. Frantz decided to follow them there to complete her graduate studies in the History of Consciousness Department. She was hired as a teaching assistant at UC Santa Cruz in 1973 and became an ardent feminist. Engstrand worked for the County and City of Santa Cruz Library Board and the two women joined the Santa Cruz Quaker Meeting, becoming active in the Quaker Lesbian Conference that met at the Ben Lomond Quaker Center. Frantz was one of the founders of the Women's Studies Department at UC Santa Cruz and was promoted to a lecturer in American and Women's Studies in 1976. The courses she taught focused on women's history, social movements in the United States, and McCarthyism. For many years, Frantz served on the UC Santa Cruz's Women's Studies Executive Committee and was a member of the board of directors for the Women's Center. She was a mentor to LGBT students and her relationship with Engstrand made the couple role models for the community.

In 1984, Frantz completed her PhD under Schaar with the dissertation Radical Visions: Alexander Meiklejohn on Education, Culture, Democracy and the First Amendment. Throughout the 1980s and 1990s, she continued her activism, speaking at events for the American Civil Liberties Union (ACLU) and the Women's International League for Peace and Freedom (WILPF), warning of the dangers of returning to McCarthyism and a backlash against pacifists, while protesting nuclear testing and the removal of affirmative action legislation. Lecturing throughout the country, she published articles in journals and newspapers, such as Mother Jones, Santa Cruz Magazine, the Santa Cruz Sentinel, and the San Jose Mercury News. She officially retired in 1989, and that year won the Teacher of the Year Award. Discontented with retirement, Frantz continued lecturing for another decade. She was honored in 1997 with a Distinguished Teaching Award from the Alumni Association.

== Death and legacy ==
In the last decade of her life, Frantz was ailing and Engstrand cared for her until she was unable to do so. After she moved to Sunshine Villa, Engstrand continued to visit as often as she could. Frantz died on October 16, 2015, in Santa Cruz. Her story was among those presented in the Oscar-nominated documentary Seeing Red in 1983. An oral history interview with Frantz taken by Kelly Anderson in 2005, forms part of the Voices of Feminism Oral History Project in the Sophia Smith Collection at Smith College in Northampton, Massachusetts.

== Selected works ==
- Frantz, Marge (1984). Radical Visions: Alexander Meiklejohn on Education, Culture, Democracy and the First Amendment (PhD). Santa Cruz, California: University of California, Santa Cruz.
- Frantz, Marge (1989). We Did Overcome: The Death of the Company Town and the House UnAmerican Activities Committee. Paul Lubow Memorial Lecture Series, October 16, 1989. Santa Cruz, California: University of California, Santa Cruz.
- Frantz, Marge (1995). "Introduction". In Abbott, Deborah; Farmer, Ellen (eds.). From Wedded Wife to Lesbian Life: Stories of Transformation. Freedom, California: Crossing Press. pp. 5–16. ISBN 978-0-89594-766-6.
- Frantz, Marge (1998). "Teachings of Karl Marx for Girls and Boys Infiltrates Alabama". In Kaplan, Judy; Shapiro, Linn (eds.). Red Diapers: Growing Up in the Communist Left. Urbana, Illinois: University of Illinois Press. pp. 45–53. ISBN 978-0-252-02161-9.
