= National Committee to Abolish the Poll Tax =

National Committee to Abolish the Poll Tax was an organization founded in 1941 by civil rights activists Joseph Gelders and Virginia Durr to obtain federal action to override poll tax legislation in the Southern United States, which was used to restrict voter rights.

== History ==
In 1938, the Southern Conference for Human Welfare created an anti-poll tax committee with president Maury Maverick and Virginia Durr as vice president. Joseph Gelders acted as executive secretary. Within a year, Maverick left the organization and Durr took over running the committee. Gelders was often away, working in labor organizing. In 1941, she and Gelders formalized the incorporation of the poll tax committee into the National Committee to Abolish the Poll Tax (NCAPT). Though Jennings Perry, a newsman who worked for The Tennessean was the official chair of NCAPT, in reality, he was a figurehead. Durr, the vice chair, along with four executive secretaries, Sylvia Beitscher, Frances Wheeler Sayler, Katherine Shryver and Sarah d'Avila ran the organization.

The organization focused upon introducing legislation to the United States Congress which would abolish payment of poll tax as a voting prerequisite in federal elections. Because the Supreme Court and declared in Breedlove v. Suttles (1937) that the Constitution did not bar states from requiring a poll tax to vote, the NCAPT focused on federal protections rather than trying to achieve state action. To achieve those ends, they built coalitions with major civil rights organizations, labor groups, and liberal political organizations. Included in the organizations they worked with were the American Association of University Women, the American Federation of Labor, the Congress of Industrial Organizations, the League of Women Voters, the Maritime Union, the National Association for the Advancement of Colored People (NAACP), the National Association of Colored Women, the National Council of Negro Women, and the National Negro Congress, among other groups.

They convinced Congressman Lee Geyer (D-California) and Senator Claude Pepper (D-Florida) to introduce bills to the US Congress in 1941 to abolish the poll tax. Though Pepper's bill resulted in a full-scale congressional debate on federal protection of voting rights, in 1942, it was only successful in waiving the poll tax payment on absentee ballots of soldiers. The Soldier Vote Act didn't change the requirement for most Southern voters, but it set a precedent that federal action was possible. The Geyer bill passed the House but was filibustered in the Senate. Bills were reintroduced in 1943, 1945, 1947, and 1948 to remove the payment of poll taxes as a condition to vote. Each proposed legislation passed the House, but was blocked in the Senate. The Cold War climate, which brought about the Red Scare, McCarthyism, and investigations by the House Un-American Activities Committee, made many of the members of the NCAPT targets. Under pressure and the threat of being labeled a communist organization, the NCAPT folded in 1948.
