= Outside the Magic Circle =

1985 biography of Virginia Foster Durr

Outside the Magic Circle: The Autobiography of Virginia Foster Durr
- Editor: Hollinger F. Barnard
- Author: Virginia Foster Durr
- Genre: Autobiography
- Publisher: University of Alabama Press
- Publication date: 1985

Outside the Magic Circle: The Autobiography of Virginia Foster Durr is a 1985 autobiography of Virginia Foster Durr edited by Hollinger F. Barnard and published by the University of Alabama Press. The book's contents were compiled from interviews taped in the mid-1970s by scholars of oral history. It provides a vivid account of the racism and misogyny of the American South in the first half of the twentieth century, as well as being the personal story of Virginia Foster Durr's life, and its text includes language attributed to others that is now considered inappropriate.

The original 1985 printing of the book was hardback, and it was republished in paperback form in 1990 and as an ebook in 2013.

The social justice education non-profit Facing History and Ourselves includes an unexpurgated excerpt from the book (pages 16–17 of the 1985 hardback edition) as a handout in its Teaching Mockingbird collection.

Durr's significance derived from at least three factors. One was her husband, Clifford Durr, who became head of the Federal Communications Commission and later was a leading civil rights lawyer. Another factor was her sister's marriage to Supreme Court Justice Hugo Black. And finally there was her intellect and education. Born into a privileged white family in Alabama in 1903 and attending Wellesley College in Boston for two years (where her own reluctance to sit down to meal with a black woman was confronted and overcome by the headmaster), Virginia eventually endured ostracism and defamation for her support of civil rights. Her interviews produced a vivid account of the paranoia of the McCarthy era and the racism, misogyny and severe economic problems of the South up through the 1960s, as in the following description by Durr of what was said by U.S. Senator "Cotton Ed" Smith of South Carolina during a fight over the poll tax:

[He] talked race all the time ... he would always go on about the sex thing. If anything happened to change the Southern system, the white women would just rush to get a black man. We'd have a race of mulattoes. He and others like him seemed maniacal on the subject of sex ... These men ... would get up and make vile speeches about white women of the South and how they were protecting them. Every black man wanted to rape a white woman and every white woman apparently wanted to be raped ... they showed a kind of sickness...I really think those fears came from the fact that the white men of the South had had so many sexual affairs with black women...It's the only thing I can figure out that made them so crazy on the subject.

== Pushback ==
Given that it openly exposes and discusses racist behavior that is traditionally little mentioned in the South, the book immediately stirred up criticism. A year after its publication, the Georgia Historical Society published a 3-page review critical of the book, written by Lewis. N. Wynne, Executive Director Emeritus of the Florida Historical Society. By focusing on what he called Durr's "patrician" background and on what she didn't do while failing to acknowledge her accomplishments, the review takes a condescending, even hostile approach to the book. Wynne compliments the editor's skill in weaving the oral histories into a coherent narrative, but ignores the Terkel introduction and dismisses the importance of Durr's narrative. Instead, he cited "Mrs. Durr's decision to take her children out of the schools in Alabama during the integration struggle and to send them to private schools in the North because the children were unhappy" and her refusal to "let an integrated group of Freedom Riders meet in her house because she felt that they would leave the area and she and her family would have to continue to suffer the abuse that such a meeting would engender."

== The Studs Terkel Introduction ==
Activist Studs Terkel, who wrote the introduction to Durr's book, was enthusiastic about her contributions to the civil rights movement and about the book itself. In his own late-life memoir Touch and Go (2007), Terkel summarizes the crux of the book's introduction, as well as the reason for its title:

In the preface, I described the three ways she could have lived her life...I said that since she was part of a white, upper-middle-class society, she could have led an easy life, been a member of a garden or book club, and behaved kindly toward the colored help. Two, if she had imagination and was stuck in this nice, easy world, she could go crazy, as did her schoolmate Zelda Sayre, later the wife of F. Scott Fitzgerald. The third is the one she took: She became the rebel girl and basically said, "The whole system is lousy and I’m going to fight it." That’s stepping outside the magic circle.

Terkel is said to have claimed that Durr's original choice for the title of the book had been "The Emancipation of Pure White Southern Womanhood". Durr fit the idealized profile for white southern women who became involved in social reform after World War II as being of Protestant background and having attended college, a profile that also seems to apply to nearly all American women, black as well as white, who became involved in social protest. Durr's book had a lot to say about the low status of southern women who failed to marry, writing, "It was only after I was safely married that I could really be interested in anything... Old maids were pitied not just because they had no husband but because a life without a husband meant a life of poverty."

== See also ==
Virginia Durr Moment
