= Nina Hartley =

American pornographic film actress (born 1959)

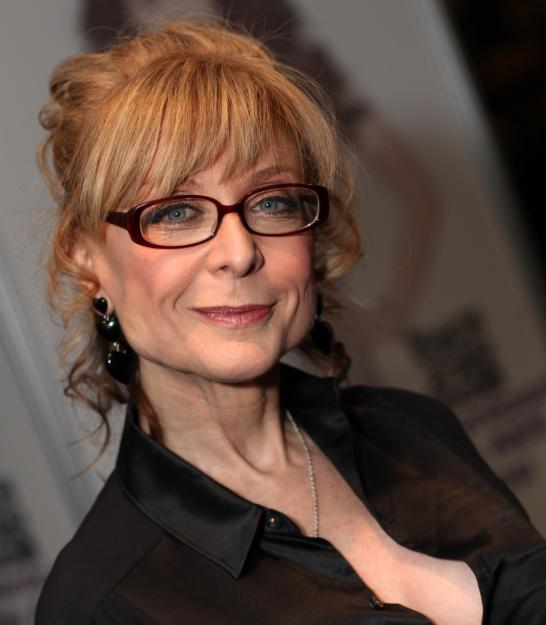
- Hartley in 2013
- Born: Marie Louise Hartman; March 1959 (age 67); Berkeley, California, U.S.
- Other names: Nina Hartman; Nina Hartwell
- Education: San Francisco State University (BSN)
- Occupations: Pornographic film actress; sex educator
- Spouses: unnamed (m. 1986; div. 2003) Ira Levine (m. 2003)
- Mother: Blanche Hartman
- Relatives: Marge Frantz (aunt); Joseph Gelders (grandfather); Emma Gelders Sterne (great aunt)
- Website: nina.com

Marie Louise Hartman (born 1959), known professionally as Nina Hartley, is an American pornographic film actress and sex educator. By 2017 she had appeared in more than 1,000 adult films. She has been described by Las Vegas Weekly as an "outspoken feminist" and "advocate for sexual freedom", and by CNBC as "a legend in the adult world".

== Early life and education ==
Hartley was born in Berkeley, California, in March 1959, the youngest of four children of a Lutheran father, Louis Hartman, and a Jewish mother, Blanche Hartman (née Gelders). Her grandfather, Joseph Gelders, was a University of Alabama physics professor, a prominent labor and civil rights activist, and a Communist Party USA (CPUSA) member in the 1930s.

Hartley's parents converted to Buddhism when she was young. Her mother supported the family as a biochemist after her father, San Francisco radio announcer Louis Hartman, was blacklisted in 1957 for his communist beliefs.

As a teenager, Hartley self-identified as a feminist, influenced by the slogan "my body, my rules". After graduating from Berkeley High School in 1977, she attended San Francisco State University's undergraduate nursing school and graduated magna cum laude in 1985, receiving a Bachelor of Science in Nursing. She was a registered nurse until her license expired in 1986.

== Adult film career ==
Hartley has stated that pornography is one of the few places where women are allowed to initiate and take pleasure in sex in a society that restricts women's sexuality with expectations of virginity, monogamy, and childbearing. She deliberately sought a career in pornography as a way to make a living by having sex, later telling Las Vegas Weekly, "Porn gave me easy access to women without having to date them or have a relationship." She writes that part of her reason for choosing sex work was to be able to indulge her exhibitionistic and voyeuristic streak. She has said she chose her life's work when she saw the 1976 erotic film The Autobiography of a Flea alone at a theater in San Francisco.

In 1982, during her sophomore year of nursing school, Hartley started working as a stripper at the Sutter Cinema and then the Mitchell Brothers O'Farrell Theatre. She told an interviewer that she chose the name "Nina" because it was easy for Japanese tourists to say during the time she was a dancer in San Francisco, and "Hartley" because it was close to her own last name, and she "wanted a name that sounded like that of a real person."

Her pornographic film debut was in Educating Nina (1984), where she was cast and directed by fellow performer Juliet Anderson. For many years, she toured the United States and Canada as a stripper and made personal appearances at sex shops. Hartley describes her father's reaction to her choice of occupation:

He asked, 'Why sex? Why not the violin?' I know now that I'm sexual the way that Mozart was musical [...] a life of public sexuality has, from my very first time on stage, been as natural to me as breathing."

In the 1980s and early 1990s, Hartley starred in several of the Debbie Does Dallas film series spin-offs such as Debbie Duz Dishes (1986) and Debbie Does Wall Street (1991). In 1992, she directed her first movie, Nina Hartley's Book of Love. She also produced and starred in a series of sex education videos for Adam & Eve. In 1994, she began her line of instructional videos marketed under the Nina Hartley's Guide brand.

She played the part of Hillary Clinton in the 2008 satirical pornographic film Who's Nailin' Paylin?, with Lisa Ann in the role of Sarah Palin. As of 2015, she was still actively performing, and by 2017 had appeared in more than one thousand pornographic films. She has been described by the San Francisco Chronicle as "one of the best-known actresses in the industry" and by CNBC as "a legend in the adult world".

== Mainstream media appearances ==
Hartley acted in the 1996 Canadian film Bubbles Galore and has appeared on The Oprah Winfrey Show and The Phil Donahue Show to defend the pornographic film industry. In the 1997 film Boogie Nights, she played William H. Macy's character's serially unfaithful wife who is murdered. She later remarked, "The only movie I ever died in for having sex was a mainstream movie."

Hartley appeared in the 1998 documentary Traci Lords: The E! True Hollywood Story and was interviewed in The Naked Feminist (2003). Hartley was featured in After Porn Ends (2012), and appears in Sticky: A (Self) Love Story (2016), in which she discusses masturbation with regards to education, the forced resignation of Joycelyn Elders, and her opinions on the blackballing of comedian Paul Reubens after his arrest for masturbating in a public theater.

== Activism ==
Las Vegas Weekly has described Hartley as an "outspoken feminist, sex educator and advocate for sexual freedom" and "a guiding force for a generation of feminist porn stars". She has described herself both as a "classical liberal feminist" and a democratic socialist. Hartley began engaging in feminist activism in the 1980s. She has said:

Based on my experience as a woman and a sexual being, and my understanding that I had the right to decide for myself what to do with my life – that's what I understood to be feminist, to give everybody choices – I didn't choose to be a mother but I chose this [porn] because it suits me.

Hartley has also been involved in socialist activism and has also been affiliated with the Adult Performer Advocacy Committee (APAC), a labor union founded in 2014 for pornographic film actors.

Hartley was elected to the board of the Free Speech Coalition in 1995, and is a long-time board member of the Woodhull Freedom Foundation (founded in 2003). She has made frequent appearances at academic conferences, workshops, and in the media to promote sex positivity. She has given lectures at Dartmouth College, Harvard University, and the University of California.

== Writing ==
In 2006, Hartley co-authored Nina Hartley's Guide to Total Sex with her husband, Ira Levine. The book includes sections on sex toys, swinging, threesomes, dominance and submission, and erotic spanking. Library Journal called the book a "well-written guide" that is "strong on both safe sex and a permissive approach", saying Hartley "handles the material frankly, accurately, and with sensitivity".

== Personal life ==
Hartley is a self-described bisexual, swinger, and exhibitionist. She married her first husband, a former Students for a Democratic Society leader, in a three-way marriage with a second woman in 1986. She describes the relationship as a "very unhappy marriage" to "someone who was not a good candidate for mating with a sex worker".

Following her divorce in 2003, Hartley married Ira Levine, known professionally as Ernest Greene, a director of bondage films and editor of Hustler's Taboo magazine, with whom she had had a secret relationship in the 1980s. They are openly polyamorous. As of 2014, the couple lives in Los Angeles.

== Publications ==
- Hartley, Nina (1993). "Reflections of a Feminist Porn Star". Porn in the USA. Gauntlet: Exploring the Limits of Free Expression. Vol. 5. Springfield, Penn.: Gauntlet Inc. pp. 62–68. ISBN 978-0-9629-6594-4.
- ——————— (1994). "Confessions of a Feminist Porno Star". In Jaggar, Alison M. (ed.). Living With Contradictions: Controversies In Feminist Social Ethics. Boulder, Colo.: Westview Press. pp. 176–178. ISBN 978-0-8133-1775-5 – via the Internet Archive.
- ——————— (1997). "In the Flesh: A Porn Star's Journey". In Nagle, Jill (ed.). Whores and Other Feminists. New York: Routledge. pp. 57–65. ISBN 978-0-4159-1822-0 – via the Internet Archive.
- With Levine, I. S. (2006). Nina Hartley's Guide to Total Sex. New York: Penguin Publishing Group. ISBN 978-1-58333-263-4.
- With Morpheous (2012). How to Be Kinkier: More Adventures in Adult Playtime. San Francisco, Calif.: Green Candy Press. ISBN 978-1-9311-6094-0.
- Hartley, Nina (2013). "Porn: An Effective Vehicle for Sexual Role Modeling and Education". In Taormino, Tristan; et al. (eds.). The Feminist Porn Book: The Politics of Producing Pleasure. New York: The Feminist Press. pp. 228–236. ISBN 978-1-5586-1818-3 – via the Internet Archive.
- ——————— (2015). "Culture Clash". In Lee, Jiz (ed.). Coming Out Like a Porn Star: Essays on Pornography, Protection, and Privacy. Berkeley, Calif.: ThreeL Media. pp. 255–256. ISBN 978-0-9905571-6-6 – via the Internet Archive.

== Awards ==
=== AVN Awards ===
Hartley has received a number of AVN Awards, including:

AVN
Category	Video/Film
1986 Best Couples Sex Scene - Film	Ten Little Maidens
1987 Best Actress - Video	Debbie Duz Dishes
1989 Best Supporting Actress - Film	Portrait of an Affair
1989 Best Couples Sex Scene - Film	Amanda By Night II
1989 Best Couples Sex Scene - Video	Sensual Escape
1991 Best Supporting Actress - Video	The Last X-Rated Movie
2000 Best Group Sex Scene - Video	Ultimate Guide to Anal Sex for Women
2005 Best Specialty Tape - BDSM	Nina Hartley's Private Sessions 13
2005 Best Specialty Tape	Spanking for Nina Hartley's Guide to Spanking
2009 Best Non-Sex Performance	Not Bewitched XXX
2013 Game Changer
AVN Hall of Fame

=== XRCO Awards ===
Hartley has won a number of XRCO Awards:

XRCO Awards
Year	Category	Video/Film
1986	Best Couple Sex Scene	Ball Busters
1987	Best Couple Sex Scene	Peeping Tom
1987	Torrid Triad Scene	Every Woman Has a Fantasy 2
1989	Female Performer of the Year	–
1990	Best Supporting Actress	My Bare Lady
1990	Best Girl-Girl Scene	Sorority Pink
1996	Hall of Fame	
2000	Best Group Scene	Ultimate Guide to Anal Sex for Women

=== Other awards ===
Misc. Awards
Year	Organization	Category
1988	Free Speech Coalition	Lifetime Achievement Award
1990	FOXE	Female Fan Favorite
1991	FOXE	Female Fan Favorite
1992	FOXE	Female Fan Favorite
1994	Legends of Erotica	Hall of Fame
1996	Hot d'Or	Lifetime Achievement Award
2005	AEBN VOD Award	Lifetime Achievement Award
2005	Hustler	Porn Block of Fame
2006	Ninfa Public	Lifetime Career Award
2014	Exxxotica Fan Choice Awards	Fanny Lifetime Achievement Award
2014	Free Speech Coalition	Leadership Award
2017	XBIZ Award	Specialty Release of the Year
2019	XBIZ Award	Best Non-Sex Acting Performance (Future Darkly: Artifamily)
2020	XBIZ Award	Best Non-Sex Acting Performance (Girls of Wrestling)

== See also ==
- Candida Royalle – American pornographic filmmaker (1950–2015)
- Feminist views on pornography
