= Virginia Durr Moment =

The Virginia Durr Moment is a phrase originating in developmental psychology and refers to an experience and "triggering event" that can foster the moral development of an individual. Characteristic of the experience is a serious challenge to an individual's value system.

The book Some Do Care, by the American husband-and-wife developmental psychologists William Damon and Anne Colby, uses the experience of Virginia Foster Durr to describe the phenomenon. Although Durr is known as a civil rights activist, she in her early years harbored racial prejudice as a result of her upbringing in Alabama, in the South. When Durr was a student at Wellesley College, her prejudiced value system was first seriously challenged. On her first night at Wellesley, Durr refused to dine at the same table at which a black girl was sitting. The head of the house explained that the rules of Wellesley College required Durr to dine with the girl for one month and that if Durr did not comply, she would have to withdraw from the college.

As Damon and Colby explain, "this was the first time Virginia's values had ever been seriously challenged and she stayed awake all night long worrying about the dilemma." She is later quoted as saying, "That was the first time I became aware that my attitude was considered foolish by some people and that Wellesley College wasn't going to stand for it. That experience had a tremendous effect on me" (p. 99).

The book Educating Citizens: Preparing America's Undergraduates for Lives of Moral and Civic Responsibility, also describes the developmental significance of Durr's challenge from Wellesley: "[T]he incident lodged in Virginia's memory, creat[ed] a fracture in her convictions about race that contributed to their later destruction" (p. 3).

A Virginia Durr Moment refers to an experience that, when used correctly, fosters moral development. It presents the opportunity for growth via the evolution of one's value system by seriously challenging one's value system in a manner that causes one to reflect on and, as a result, reject it in whole or in part. When used correctly, the order of the causal sequence of a Virginia Durr Moment consists in serious challenge, self-reflection, modification of value system, and then moral development. Ultimately, it is up to individuals to use the Virginia Durr Moment to promote growth and to further their moral development.

In the United Kingdom, some circles understand Paul McCartney's "Blackbird" as describing the moral development fostered by the proper usage of a Virginia Durr Moment. An individual may experience a Virginia Durr Moment, fail to use its power, and thereby remain in a condition of developmental stasis and moral immaturity.

== Bibliography ==
- Some Do Care: Contemporary Lives of Moral Commitment by Anne Colby and William Damon (1992; New York: Free Press). ISBN 0029063566
- Outside the Magic Circle: The Autobiography of Virginia Foster Durr, edited by Hollinger F. Barnard (1985; New York: Simon & Schuster/Touchstone, 1987). ISBN 0-671-63855-6
- Educating Citizens: Preparing America's Undergraduates for Lives of Moral and Civic Responsibility, by Anne Colby, Thomas Ehrlic, Elizabeth Beaumont, and Jason Stephens (2003; San Francisco: Josey-Bass/Carnegie Foundation for the Advancement of Teaching). ISBN 0-7879-6515-4
