= Clifford Durr =

American lawyer (1899–1975)

Commissioner of the Federal Communications Commission
- In office November 1, 1941 – June 30, 1948
- President: Franklin D. Roosevelt; Harry S. Truman

Personal details
- Born: Clifford Judkins Durr; March 2, 1899 Montgomery, Alabama
- Died: May 12, 1975 (aged 76) Elmore County, Alabama
- Resting place: Greenwood Cemetery, Montgomery, Alabama
- Party: Democratic
- Spouse: Virginia Durr (m. 1926)
- Children: 5
- Education: University of Alabama (B.A.); Oxford University (B.C.L.)
- Occupation: Lawyer

Clifford Judkins Durr (March 2, 1899 – May 12, 1975) was an Alabama lawyer who played an important role in defending activists and others accused of disloyalty during the New Deal and McCarthy eras. He also was the lawyer who represented Rosa Parks in her challenge to the constitutionality of the ordinance that required infamous segregation of passengers on buses in Montgomery. The Parks case launched the 1955-1956 Montgomery bus boycott.

Durr was born into a patrician Alabama family. After studying at the University of Alabama, being president of his class, he went to Oxford as a Rhodes Scholar. He returned to the United States to study law, then joined a prominent law firm in Birmingham, Alabama, in 1924. In 1926 he married Virginia Foster, whose sister, Josephine, would be the first wife of Hugo Black.

== Early life ==
Clifford Judkins Durr was born on March 2, 1899, in Montgomery, Alabama, to John Wesley Durr and Lucy Judkins Durr. His grandfather, John Weseley Durr, was a business agent for cotton growers, and his other grandfather, James Henry Judkins, was a plantation owner prior to the Civil War. Both of his grandfathers served in the Confederate Army during the civil war.

Growing up, Durr attended Miss Woodruff's Academy and the Starke University School for Boys, a private academy in Montgomery. Durr started his college career at the University of Alabama, where his fellow student body elected him president of his class. Later on, in college, he won the Rhodes Scholarship to Queen's College, Oxford University, in England. He graduated from Oxford with a third-class honours Bachelor of Civil Law degree after he elected to sit for the more challenging examination.

In April 1926, Clifford married Virginia Foster Durr in the hope of her being a housewife and great social figure, and he became a very successful and influential corporate lawyer. Clifford began his career in law at the Martin, Thompson, Foster, and Turner Law firm, located in Birmingham, Alabama.

== Government service ==
Clifford had risen to a full partner in his law firm by 1927. His income was such that he was little affected by the onset of the Great Depression in 1929. As economic conditions worsened, both Clifford and Virginia were becoming more aware of the inequality and the injustice that characterized many responses to the collapse. It was that awareness that caused Clifford to unexpectedly leave the firm early in 1933.

When members of the junior staff were laid off for financial reasons, Clifford suggested that the more senior members of the firm, including himself, take a pay cut to avoid future firings. The suggestion was not supported by the other senior staff. Cliff thus found his continued association with the firm to be untenable. A few weeks after leaving this position, Clifford's brother-in-law, Hugo Black, then a US Senator, asked him to come to Washington, DC, to interview for a job with the Reconstruction Finance Corporation, the agency charged with recapitalizing banks and trusts. Clifford took the job and became a dedicated New Dealer in the process. He resigned from that agency in 1941 after a series of disagreements with his superiors over their approval of agreements with defense contractors that allowed them to concentrate their monopoly position and to derive windfall profits from war preparation efforts.

US President Franklin Roosevelt then appointed Durr to the Federal Communications Commission, a politically sensitive position as Roosevelt sought to counter the increasing power and concentration of broadcasters, many of whom were opponents of the New Deal. Durr supported FCC Chairman James Lawrence Fly in defending the Commission's program of regulation before the House Select Committee to Investigate the FCC, and he unsuccessfully petitioned Speaker of the House Sam Rayburn to remove the committee's chairman, E. E. Cox, for conflict of interest. Durr campaigned to set aside frequencies for educational programs and to sell them to more diverse applicants, some of whom were attacked for their leftist politics.

In 1945, he was appointed the head of an FCC study to determine if the radio broadcasters upheld their pledges to provide public service programs. It found that broadcasters were often plagued with excessive advertising and a very little educational programming. The resulting report, the Blue Book, defined the guidelines of the FCC's regulatory authority over programming, including the requirement of public service programs of local culture, education, and community affairs. Investigations of the FCC by the House Un-American Activities Committee and J. Edgar Hoover's Federal Bureau of Investiagtion were then initiated in an attempt to find socialist ties.

== Representing dissenters ==
Durr resigned from the FCC in 1948 after he dissented from its adoption of a loyalty oath demanded by the Truman administration. In the elections that year, he supported former Vice President Henry A. Wallace, the candidate of the Progressive Party, for president. Although Durr did not know it, the FBI had already put him under surveillance in 1942 because he had defended a colleague accused of left-wing political associations. His wife's vigorous support for racial equality and voting rights for blacks and their friendship with Jessica Mitford, a member of the American Communist Party, made both of them even more suspect. The FBI stepped up its interest in Durr in 1949, when he joined the National Lawyers Guild. He subsequently became the President of the Guild.

Durr opened a law practice in Washington, DC, after he left the FCC. He was one of the few lawyers willing to represent federal employees who had lost their jobs as a result of the loyalty oath program; he took many of their cases without charging them a fee. Durr did not apply any litmus test of his own and chose to represent both those who had been members of or closely aligned with the Communist Party and those falsely accused of membership. Durr subsequently represented Frank Oppenheimer, the brother of the "father of the atomic bomb," Robert Oppenheimer, as well as several other scientists investigated for disloyalty by the House Un-American Activities Committee.

Durr and his wife moved to Colorado to work for the National Farmers Union when it became evident that he could not make a living defending those accused of disloyalty. However, his wife's political activities, as a member of the Southern Conference for Human Welfare and the National Committee for the Abolition of the Poll Tax, her past membership in the Progressive Party, and his own political activities caused him to lose that position as well.

== Civil rights work ==
The Durrs then returned to Montgomery, Alabama, in the hope of returning to a more prosperous, less controversial life. However, US Senator James Eastland of Mississippi soon subpoenaed Clifford Durr and his associate Aubrey Williams to a hearing of the Senate Subcommittee on Internal Security investigating the Highlander Folk School with which both Durrs and Williams had been associated. With the assistance of Senator Lyndon Johnson of Texas, Durr succeeded in discrediting the hearing but only after he had nearly come to blows with a witness in the hearing room. In the process, however, Durr's health and law practice suffered, as he lost most of his white clients, and the FBI increased its surveillance of him and those around him.

Durr continued to practice in Montgomery as counsel, along with a local attorney Fred Gray, for black citizens whose rights had been violated. He and Gray were prepared to appeal the conviction of Claudette Colvin, a 15-year-old African-American woman charged with violating Montgomery's bus segregation laws in March 1955 but elected not to do so when E.D. Nixon, later of the Montgomery Improvement Association, and other black activists decided not the case to use to challenge the law because of her teenage pregnancy.

Durr was therefore ready in December 1955, when police arrested Rosa Parks for refusing to give her seat to a white man. Durr called the jail when authorities refused to tell Nixon what the charges against Parks were. He and his wife accompanied Nixon to the jail when Nixon bailed her out. Nixon and Durr then went to the Parks' home to discuss whether she was prepared to fight the charges against her. Durr and Gray represented Parks in her criminal appeals in state court, and Gray took on the federal court litigation and challenged the constitutionality of the ordinance.

Durr continued to represent activists in the Civil Rights Movement, supported by financial support from friends and philanthropists outside the South. He eventually closed his firm in 1964. He lectured in the United States and abroad after his retirement. He died at his grandfather's farm in 1975.
