= Babcock Memorial Park =

Park in Minnesota, United States

Babcock Park
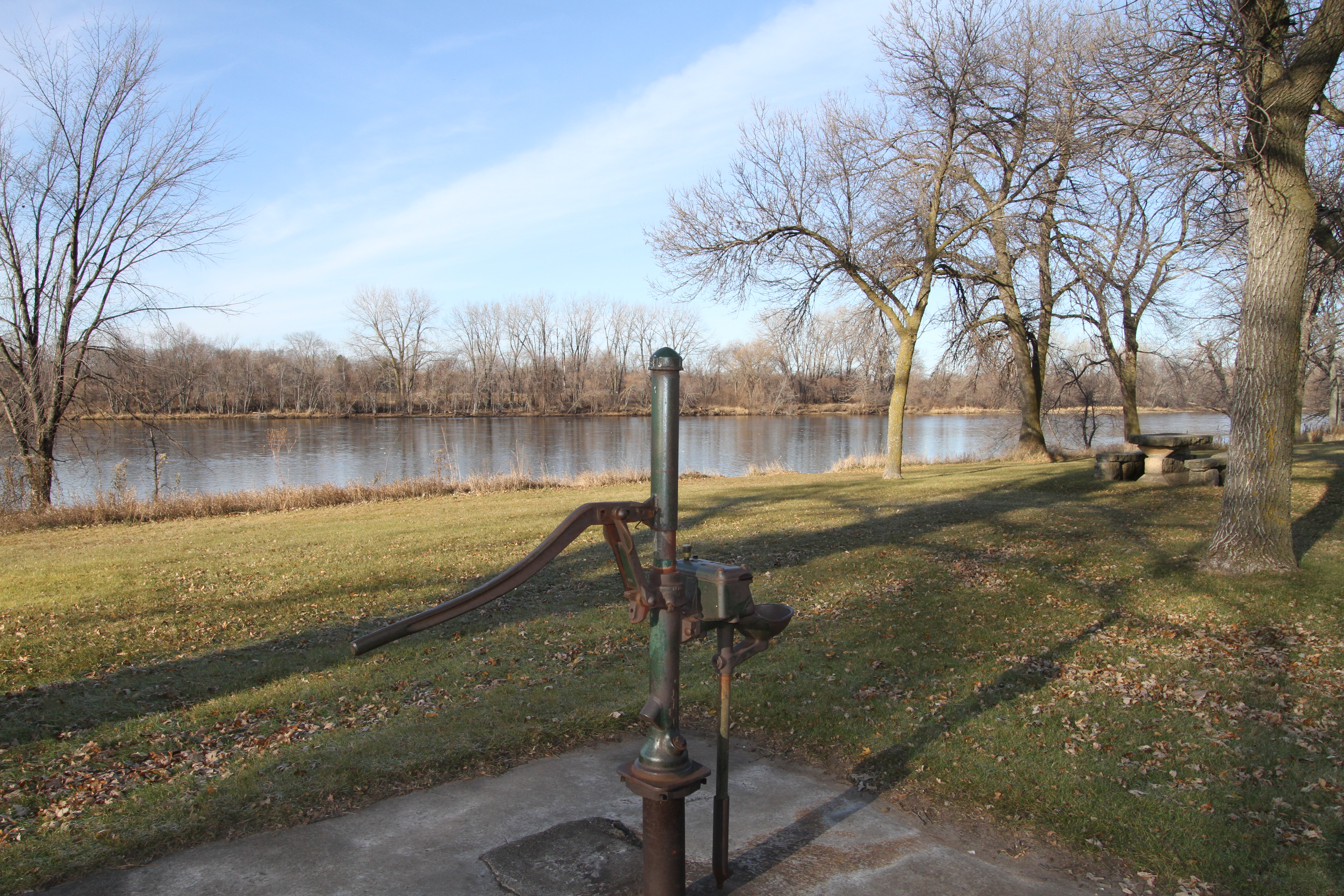
- Interactive map of Babcock Park
- Coordinates: 45°17′35″N 93°33′33″W

Babcock Memorial Park, also called Babcock Wayside, is a highway rest area and public boat launch on the Mississippi River in Elk River, Minnesota at the intersection of U.S. 10 and Route 169. Its name honors Highway Commissioner Charles Merritt Babcock, who was from the area and is regarded as the originator of the modern Minnesota State Highway System. The state owns it but has turned maintenance over to the city.

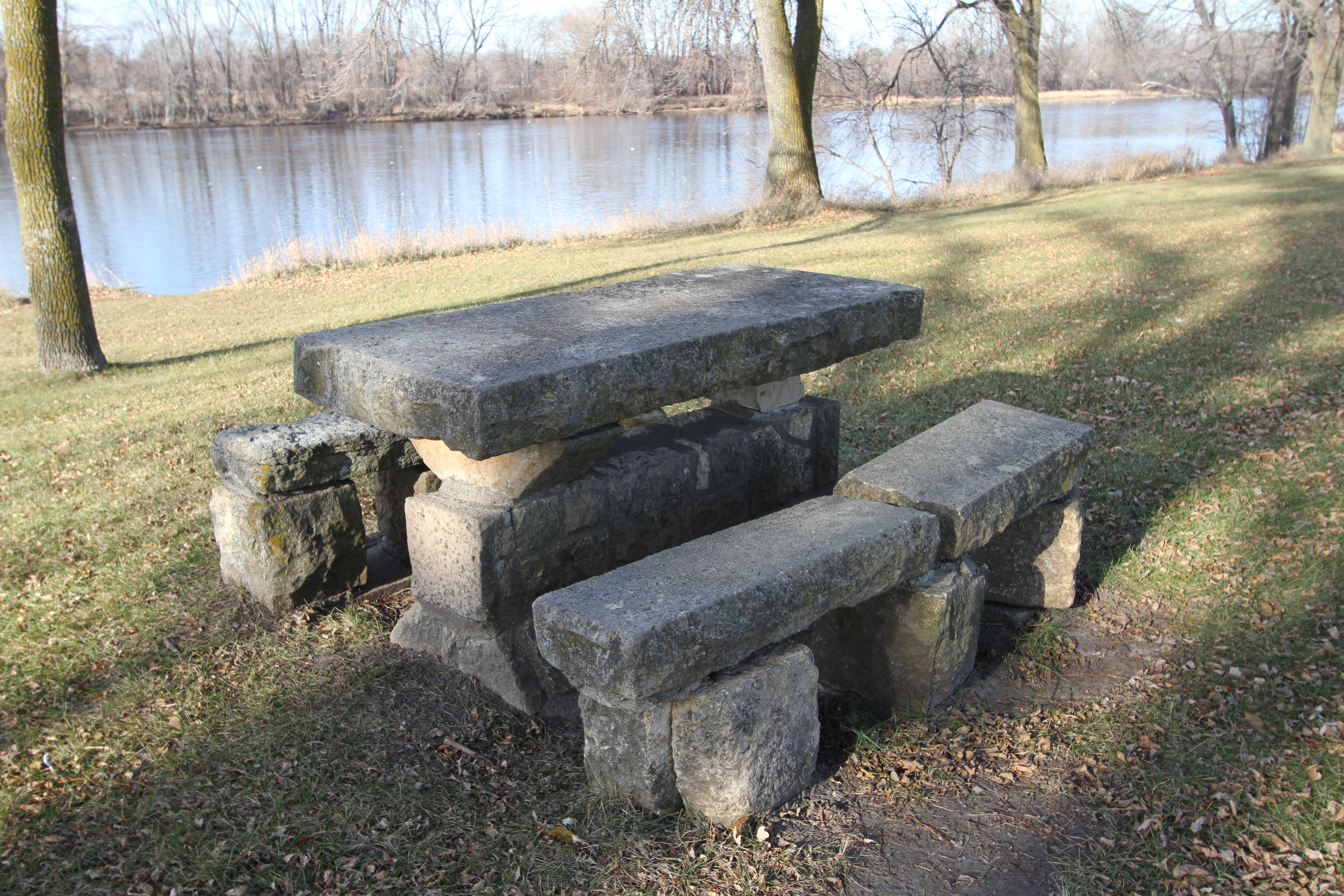
A stone picnic table in the park

The park was built by the National Youth Administration in 1938 and 1939 and preserves two fieldstone council rings, a stone picnic table, and a hand-operated pump from that era. A geological marker, modern toilets, and other amenities were added later. It contains about 16 acres (6.5 ha), but it was considerably larger before the adjacent highways were expanded with cloverleaf interchanges.
