= Lucy Randolph Mason =

American labor activist and suffragist (1882–1959)

- Born: July 26, 1882; Alexandria, Virginia, U.S.
- Died: May 6, 1959 (aged 76); Atlanta, Georgia, U.S.
- Resting place: Ivy Hill Cemetery

Lucy Randolph Mason (July 26, 1882 – May 6, 1959) was an American labor activist and suffragist. She was involved in the union movement, the consumer movement and the civil rights movement in the mid-20th century.

== Early life ==
Lucy Randolph Mason was born on the Clarens estate in Virginia near Alexandria July 26, 1882 and grew up near Richmond. Mason was one of five children born to Episcopal minister Landon Mason and his wife Lucy Ambler Mason. She was a fifth-generation descendant of George Mason, author of the Virginia Declaration of Rights which was the model for the Bill of Rights. Mason was also related to John Marshall and Robert E. Lee (her father's second cousin).

Growing up in the Episcopal Church with a clergyman father and devoted mother developed strong social convictions in Lucy and her siblings. After high school, Mason taught herself stenography while teaching Sunday school classes. It was during this time that she began to be interested in women's rights, specifically voting rights, working towards improving conditions for working people and ending racial injustice, specifically in the South.

== Career ==
During her 20s while supporting herself as a stenographer, she devoted her free time to volunteer social service work and the suffrage movement. In 1914 the Richmond YWCA offered her a job as its industrial secretary, which she stayed on as until 1918. In 1918, Mason's mother died and she was forced to quit in order to be able to care for her ailing father. During the years that Mason cared for her father she continued to volunteer for the Union Label League and served as president of both the Richmond Equal Suffrage League and the Richmond League of Women Voters. In 1923, Mason's father died and she returned to the YWCA as the general secretary and remained there until 1932. During her time as general secretary she developed a range of innovative programs that were aimed at training and the economic advancement in the lives of both white and black young women and workers in general. With the YWCA Mason generated public support for state labor laws that ensure safe workplaces, end child labor, raise minimum wages, and shorten work hours. Mason also traveled throughout the South during this time promoting voluntary employment agreements that incorporated fair labor standards. To aid this effort she wrote a pamphlet Standards for Workers in Southern Industry (1931), which was the first pamphlet of its kind.

She belonged to the Union Label League in Richmond and was a frequent speaker to community and labor groups about the importance of buying union made products and services. During World War I, American Federation of Labor (AFL) President, Samuel Gompers, appointed Mason as the Virginia chairwoman of the Women in Industry Committee, a division of the wartime National Advisory Committee on Labor.

She was so successful in her ventures during this time that she drew the interest of other female reformers, Florence Kelley and First Lady Eleanor Roosevelt. Mason made such an impression that Kelley chose her as successor for her role as secretary of the National Consumers League (NCL). In 1932 she was appointed as General Secretary to the NCL, and moved to New York, where she lived for five years; working closely with social workers and recruiting staff for relief and welfare agencies created under the New Deal. It was during this period she met and impressed Eleanor Roosevelt, with whom she was friends with for the rest of their lives.

From the 1900s to the 1930s, the NCL worked to pass protective labor laws and to convince consumers to buy only goods and services produced by workers who enjoyed a living wage and decent working conditions. Under Mason, the NCL won the passage of new state labor laws, lobbied for improved labor codes in the 1933 National Industrial Recovery Act and helped ensure the passage of the 1938 Fair Labor Standards Act (FLSA).

=== The South and the CIO ===
In 1937, during congressional hearings on the FLSA, Mason met Congress of Industrial Organizations (CIO) President, John L. Lewis, who helped arrange a job for her as the CIO's public relations representative for the South. In July 1937, at age 55, Mason moved to Atlanta and started working at the Textile Workers Organizing Committee offices and became the CIO's "roving ambassador" for the next 16 years.

For Mason, the CIO was "a training ground for citizenship" for Southern workers, a vehicle "to bring democracy to the South" and the means to alleviate the economic and racial injustices experienced by minorities and the poor. Mason traveled alone to small towns where union organizers and their sympathizers had been shot, beaten, threatened and jailed. She cornered hostile sheriffs, judges, newspaper editors, politicians and ministers, explaining workers' rights to organize and bargain under the new federal statutes and promoting an understanding of the need for unions.

She was known by friend and foe as "Miss Lucy". Her social status as a Southern lady and the daughter of an old, respected Virginia family often gained her access to political and community leaders when others were denied.

You can't get much kosher than that in Virginia, but she kind of had an interest in working people that most people of that kind of background don't have...Boy, she was a power. We would all yell for Lucy anytime that we needed help and she would come into the toughest situations and was great. She played a tremendous role, a tremendous role. - Myles Horton

Miss Lucy's success also rested on her blunt speech, her calm yet steely demeanor and her ability to bring civil liberties violations to the attention of federal officials, including President Franklin D. Roosevelt. For example, Mason convinced Roosevelt to send a special federal investigator to Memphis in 1940 in the wake of physical attacks on the United Rubber Workers' organizers who were trying to create an interracial union.

After 1944, Mason worked with the CIO Political Action Committee ("CIO-PAC") in the South, helping to register union members, black and white, and working for the elimination of the poll tax.

She also forged lasting links between labor and religious groups. Mason persuaded the Southern Baptist Convention to adopt a resolution in 1938 recognizing "the right of labor to organize and engage in collective bargaining to the end that labor may have a fair and living wage, such as will provide not only the necessities of life, but for recreation, pleasure, and culture."

In the 1940s, she organized interfaith, multi-union and interracial groups in Atlanta and other Southern cities dedicated to building solidarity between organized labor and the churches. Eventually, these local groups formed the National Religion and Labor Foundation. Mason was dedicated to ending white supremacy in the South, where she was a founding member of the Southern Conference for Human Welfare and she was a frequent speaker at interracial gatherings.

In 1952, Lucy Randolph Mason's autobiography was published called To Win These Rights, which contained an introduction written by her close friend, Eleanor Roosevelt. In 1953, Mason retired from active union work due to ill health.

In 1959, she died in a nursing home in Atlanta. She was buried in Ivy Hill Cemetery in Alexandria.

== Awards ==
- 1952: Social Justice Award from the National Religion and Labor Foundation

== Works ==
- The Shorter Day and Women Workers - 1922
- Standards For Workers in Southern Industry - 1931
- Work, Wages, and Security - 1933
- The Industrial South - 1936
- To Win These Rights: a personal story of the CIO in the South - 1952.
