= Virginia Foster Durr =

American civil rights activist and lobbyist (1903–1999)

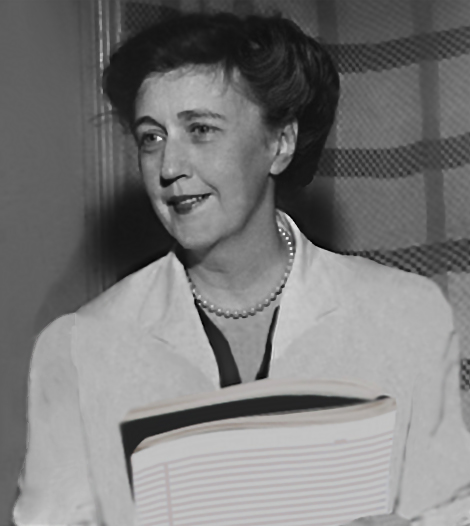
- Durr in 1948
- Born: August 6, 1903; Birmingham, Alabama, U.S.
- Died: February 24, 1999 (aged 95)
- Education: Wellesley College
- Political party: Democratic
- Other political affiliations: Progressive
- Spouse: Clifford Durr (m. 1926; died 1975)
- Children: 5

Virginia Foster Durr (August 6, 1903 – February 24, 1999) was an American civil rights activist and lobbyist. She was born in Birmingham, Alabama, in 1903 to Dr. Sterling Foster, an Alabama Presbyterian minister, and Ann Patterson Foster. At 22, she married lawyer Clifford Durr with whom she had five children, one of whom died in infancy.

Durr was a close friend of Rosa Parks and Eleanor Roosevelt and was a sister-in-law (through her sister's marriage) of Supreme Court Justice Hugo Black, who sat on many crucial civil rights cases. Her circle of friends extended to Alger Hiss.

She was inducted into the Alabama Women's Hall of Fame in 2006.

== Life ==
=== Background and education ===
Durr was born in Birmingham, Alabama, where she was raised by black women but was also taught that the Ku Klux Klan protected Southern womanhood. She has written about how her childhood was influenced by “racial innocence,” or a lack of racial consciousness, because she had been so closely associated with black domestic workers. Her eventual loss of innocence would be brought upon by the very same rigid racial hierarchies expected from all members of white Southern society. One of her grandfathers had owned a plantation and slaves, and the other was a member of the Ku Klux Klan. She was presented as a debutante in 1923.

Durr attended Wellesley College, in Massachusetts from 1920 to 1923. Durr explicitly acknowledged Wellesley as the catalyst of her moral transformation from a racist to civil rights activist. She came to question segregation after her experience with her college's dining hall. The dining halls had a rotating tables policy that required students to eat meals with random students regardless of their race. Durr, uncomfortable with this idea, protested the rule but ended up dealing with it after the head of her house threatened to release her from the university if she did not accept the rotating tables policy. See Virginia Durr Moment.

Exposure to new environments and new expectations while attending Wellesley College contributed to another aspect of her eventual ideology transformations. The exposure to the new expectations for race and sex in her environment would begin to slowly erode the racism and sexism of her youth, leading to her eventual opposition to segregation and inequality.

Durr was forced to withdraw from Wellesley College for financial reasons in 1923 and returned home to Birmingham, Alabama. Once back home in the South, she continued to struggle with the societal expectations placed on elite Southern women. In time, she would reflect that she was raised to believe marriage, social standing, and submission to men's authority far outweighed taking action against political oppression.

=== Marriage ===
After withdrawing from school in 1923, Virginia Durr returned home to Birmingham, Alabama, where she met her future husband Clifford Durr at church. Virginia Durr and Clifford Durr got married in April, 1926, and had five children. Clifford married Virginia Foster Durr in the hope of her being a housewife and great social figure, and he became a very successful and influential corporate lawyer.

While accepting the role of housewife, Virginia was bothered by the condition many workers and their families were in, which she had noticed while volunteering in social work for churches. That realization of the economic opportunities was one of the earliest aspects of her political growth. At first, however, she viewed the issues through a regional lens, rather than as part of a much larger system of racial and social inequality. Virginia and Clifford Durr gave legal, financial, and moral support to civil rights activists.

=== Activism ===
In 1933 Durr moved with her husband to Washington, DC, after he was appointed legal counsel to the Reconstruction Finance Corporation and later Chief Legal Counsel to the Defense Plant Corporation, where they eventually became New Dealers. It was in Washington where Virginia Durr's activism began. As her political development progressed during this period, she became more acutely aware of the inter-connections among economic injustices, gender inequality, and racial discrimination. She met important people through her husband's New Deal contacts, some of whom changed her conservative views on civil matters. While her husband was working for the Reconstruction Finance Corporation, Durr joined the Woman's National Democratic Club. In 1938, she was one of the founding members of the Southern Conference for Human Welfare (SCHW), an interracial group working to reduce segregation and improve living conditions in the South. The group was formed in part as a response to US President Franklin Roosevelt's proclamation that the South was the leading economic problem in the nation.

By 1941, Durr became the vice president of the SCHW's civil rights subcommittee. The fact that the poll tax worked to disenfranchise both poor people and women in the South made her work in abolishing the poll tax extremely valuable in her further development as a politician. As she moved from advocating for women's right to vote to critiquing the overall system of inequality that existed in America, she reflected the broadening scope of her politics. Working together with First Lady Eleanor Roosevelt, she lobbied for legislation to abolish the poll tax. She worked jointly with liberal political leaders in order to gain the necessary support needed for legislation, which ultimately resulted in the passing of the Voting Rights Act of 1965. Durr later recalled her work with the SCHW as one of the happiest events of her life. Similarly to other southern liberal politicians of the time, Durr's civil rights advocacy took place within New Deal reform networks. Within those networks, she increasingly recognized that racial inequality was central to most efforts at promoting democracy and securing economic justice.

While Durr eventually became an outspoken advocate of ending segregation, historians also argue that her views still retained some degree of paternalism, rooted in her Southern upbringing.

==== Progressive Party candidate ====
Quote from an obituary written by Patricia Sullivan:

"Mrs. Durr ran for the U.S. Senate from Virginia on the Progressive ticket in 1948. At that time she said, "I believe in equal rights for all citizens and I believe the tax money that is now going for war and armaments and the militarization of our country could be better used to give everyone in the United States a secure standard of living."

Her opponents were Democrat Absalom Willis Robertson, Republican Robert H. Woods, Independent Howard Carwile, and Socialist Clarke T. Robbe.

==== McCarthy era ====
During the McCarthy era, there was intense anti-communist suspicion in the United States, and one made accusations of disloyalty without proper evidence. Durr was called to New Orleans to appear before Senator James Eastland's Internal Security Committee, which investigated suspected Communists. Because the Durrs did not openly condemn communism, anti-communist activists often targeted them. At the committee, Durr gave her name, assured that she was not a communist, and then refused to answer any further questions.

Historians see Durr's lack of cooperation combined with her calm, almost theatrical, demeanor during the hearings as an example of how she effectively utilized expectations of being a Southern woman to fight against political pressure and continued to be seen as a credible citizen.

=== Montgomery ===
In 1951, Durr returned with her husband to Montgomery, Alabama, where she became acquainted with local civil rights activists like Rosa Parks, Aubrey Williams, E.D. Nixon, and Myles Horton.

Durr's activism started once she joined the local Council of Human Relations, Montgomery's only interracial political organization. Durr supported the Student Nonviolent Coordinating Committee (SNCC) workers by housing and taking care of many volunteers who came to Montgomery to work on voter registration issues. She became the "unofficial den mother for young activists," according to her close friend Dorothy M. Zellner. Both Durrs supported the Voting Rights Act and provided legal advice to many blacks facing jail time and lawsuits despite the criticism that they received from their white colleagues. They supported the sit-in movement and Freedom Riders. Virginia and her husband offered sleeping space to students coming from the North to protest. Through the couple's work for civil rights, they became close associates of E.D. Nixon, the president of the Montgomery NAACP chapter.

When Virginia arrived at Montgomery in 1951, she recalled, "When I came here, there were two groups of United Church Women, one black and one white." A group of people in her town arranged to have integrated church meetings of black and white women. There was much opposition to the integrated meetings from the locals, as well as from within the church. In her autobiography, she wrote how the head of the integration group United Church Women in the South (UCWS) came to one of the meetings. Opponents of the meeting took the license plate numbers from the cars and later published the addresses and telephone numbers of the members in an Alabama Ku Klux Klan magazine, "Sheet Lightning." The women of the UCWS received harassing phone calls. Some had family members who publicly distanced themselves from their activities because it was bad for business. As a result, the women became too afraid to continue their meetings, and the group broke up.

External videos
- “Interview with Virginia Durr” conducted for Eyes on the Prize in 1986 discusses her friendship with Rosa Parks.

Virginia Durr met Rosa Parks through close friend E.D. Nixon, who worked with Parks during his time working with the NAACP. Durr employed Rosa Parks part-time as a seamstress; she sewed for Virginia and her children, and after a while Virginia considered Parks a close friend. In an exclusive interview with Eyes on the Prize Virginia goes in more depth about their relationship, "I went to see her and took her some clothes and took her some of my daughters' and we, they, they, she fixed the clothes for them and I'd often stay and help her. Mrs. Parks was a really lovely woman." During the summer of 1955, Myles Horton, a close friend of Durr, asked her to recommend a black person to attend workshops at Highlander Folk School, the purpose of which was to put into effect the recent Brown v. Board of Education decision. Durr arranged a full scholarship for Rosa Parks to go to the school in Tennessee. It was there that Parks experienced true equality for the first time in her life. In December 1955, Virginia and Clifford, along with E.D. Nixon, bailed Parks from jail after she was arrested for refusing to give up her bus seat for a white person. Afterwards, the Durrs, along with the NAACP, aided Rosa Parks in bringing her case to the Supreme Court. Parks's actions sparked what we know of now as the Montgomery bus boycott, which Virginia and Clifford supported by all means. Durr's involvement was instrumental for the Civil Rights Movement in Montgomery. Although she was not a key public figure, she made significant contributions to the movement behind the scenes by providing funds for the cause and shelter for activists and by connecting local organizers to larger networks of support.

The importance of this type of behind-the-scenes contribution from white liberal Southerners has been one area of emphasis by historians as they look at what sustained the organization involved in the Montgomery bus boycott and what increased interracial solidarity throughout the movement.

Virginia and her husband also had associations with Martin Luther King Jr., who, along with his wife sent the Durrs a postcard from their trip to India in 1959. In March 1965, during the Selma to Montgomery march, the Durrs housed many of the volunteers in their home. In her autobiography, she recalls “I spent all my time making coffee and frying bacon and eggs for them.” After the boycott, Virginia remained an involved civil rights activist such as by working for a variety of organizations such as the Women's International League for Peace and Freedom. She continued traveling and speaking across the country to colleges, community groups, and civil rights commemorations.

=== Assessment of Wallace phenomenon ===
During the 1966 Alabama gubernatorial campaign during which the white supremacist Governor George C. Wallace stage-managed the surrogate candidacy of his wife, Lurleen Wallace, Durr wrote that the Wallace campaign motto, "Stand Up for Alabama," "does not mean one dam, single thing except to prevent integration." The appeal, she stated, "sets people on fire," especially white teenagers who "pursue you downtown [in Montgomery] with Wallace stickers and it's almost your life if you refuse one, as they look at you with such hatred ... and go on screaming 'Stand up for Alabama.'"

She further assessed his presidential applications in a May 1966 letter a friend: “I know you think I am crazy when I say he expects to be President. But he actually does. He thinks the race issue is going to become more and more the central issue [of American politics], and he is going to arouse hatred all over the whole country, and then pose as their Saviour.”

=== Later life ===
Clifford Durr died on May 12, 1975, at the age of 76, and Virginia Durr continued to write and speak about political issues. She remained active in state and local politics until she was in her nineties. In 1985, she published her autobiography, Outside the Magic Circle. She continued being politically active until a few years before her death. She died in Carlisle, Pennsylvania, on February 24, 1999, at the age of 95.

Upon hearing of Durr's death, Rosa Parks said that Durr's "upbringing of privilege did not prohibit her from wanting equality for all people. She was a lady and a scholar, and I will miss her."

President Bill Clinton said after her death, "Her courage, outspokenness, and steely conviction in the earliest days of the civil rights movement helped change this nation forever."

== Writings ==
Durr published her memoir, Outside the Magic Circle: The Autobiography of Virginia Foster Durr, in 1990, almost a decade before her death.

Her memoirs cover the New Deal era, the beginning of the Cold War, her participation in the US presidential campaign of Henry A. Wallace, anti-Communism and McCarthyism, and the Civil Rights Movement of the 1950s and the 1960s.

Of note is the account of her acquaintance with Alger Hiss ("a charming and attractive fellow") and of her version of the breakdown of his marriage with Priscilla Hiss. During the 1930s in Washington, DC, Durr knew the Hisses through Marnie and Henry Abbott, the latter of whom descended from the family of US President John Adams. Some years later, she saw Priscilla Hiss at the wedding of the oldest child of Clark Foreman, the founder of the National Emergency Civil Liberties Committee and a Wallace aide during the 1948 elections. Aside from aging past point of recognition, Mrs. Hiss, according to Durr, was "terribly bitter" about her separation from Alger Hiss:

He [Hiss] became a symbolic hero, particularly to a lot of rich women here in New York. And they just took him away from me. They surrounded him and made him a hero and became worshippers, formed a cult almost.

== Bibliography ==
- Durr, Virginia Foster (1990). Outside the Magic Circle: The Autobiography of Virginia Foster Durr. University of Alabama Press. pp. 202–206 ("cult" p. 204). ISBN 9780817305178.
- Freedom Writer: Virginia Foster Durr, Letters from the Civil Rights Years, edited by Patricia Sullivan (New York: Routledge, 2003). ISBN 0-415-94516-X
- Dreier, Peter (2012). The 100 Greatest Americans of the 20th Century: A Social Justice Hall of Fame. New York: Nation Books. p. 196-199. ISBN 1568586817
