= Southern Conference for Human Welfare =

Social justice organization in the southern U.S.

Southern Conference for Human Welfare (SCHW)
- Map of the U.S. South (2011), region supported by the SCHW
- Successor: Southern Conference Educational Fund (SCEF)
- Formation: November 20, 1938; 87 years ago
- Founder: Joseph Gelders, Lucy Randolph Mason, Hugo Black, Aubrey Willis Williams, Mary McLeod Bethune, James Dombrowski, Bibb Graves, Virginia Foster Durr
- Founded at: Birmingham, Alabama
- Dissolved: November 21, 1948; 77 years ago
- Purpose: Promote social justice, civil rights, electoral reform
- Headquarters: Birmingham, Alabama

The Southern Conference for Human Welfare (SCHW) (1938–1948) was an organization that sought to promote New Deal-type reforms to the South in terms of social justice, civil rights, and electoral reform. It folded due to funding problems and allegations of Communist sympathies; its successor was the former sub-group the Education Fund.

== History ==
=== Background ===
Eleanor Roosevelt (here, in 1938 with George T. Bye upper right, Deems Taylor upper left, Westbrook Pegler lower left) embraced the SCHW

During latter years of the Great Depression, US President Franklin Delano Roosevelt (FDR) recognized that many New Deal programs were failing in the US South. In 1938, he convened a group of southern, liberal scholars and writers to investigate conditions. Their investigation resulted in A Report on the Economic Conditions of the South, calling the South "the nation's number one economic problem" based on low wages (and resulting low incomes) as well as public services. Two members of the group were Joseph Gelders, an organizer for the CPUSA's International Labor Defense, and Lucy Randolph Mason, scion of the famed Randolph family of Virginia, then public-relations representative for the Congress of Industrial Organizations ("CIO") in the South. They advocated for a regional conference "to address the repression of civil liberties in southern cities," which both FDR and wife Eleanor Roosevelt embraced.

=== Founding ===
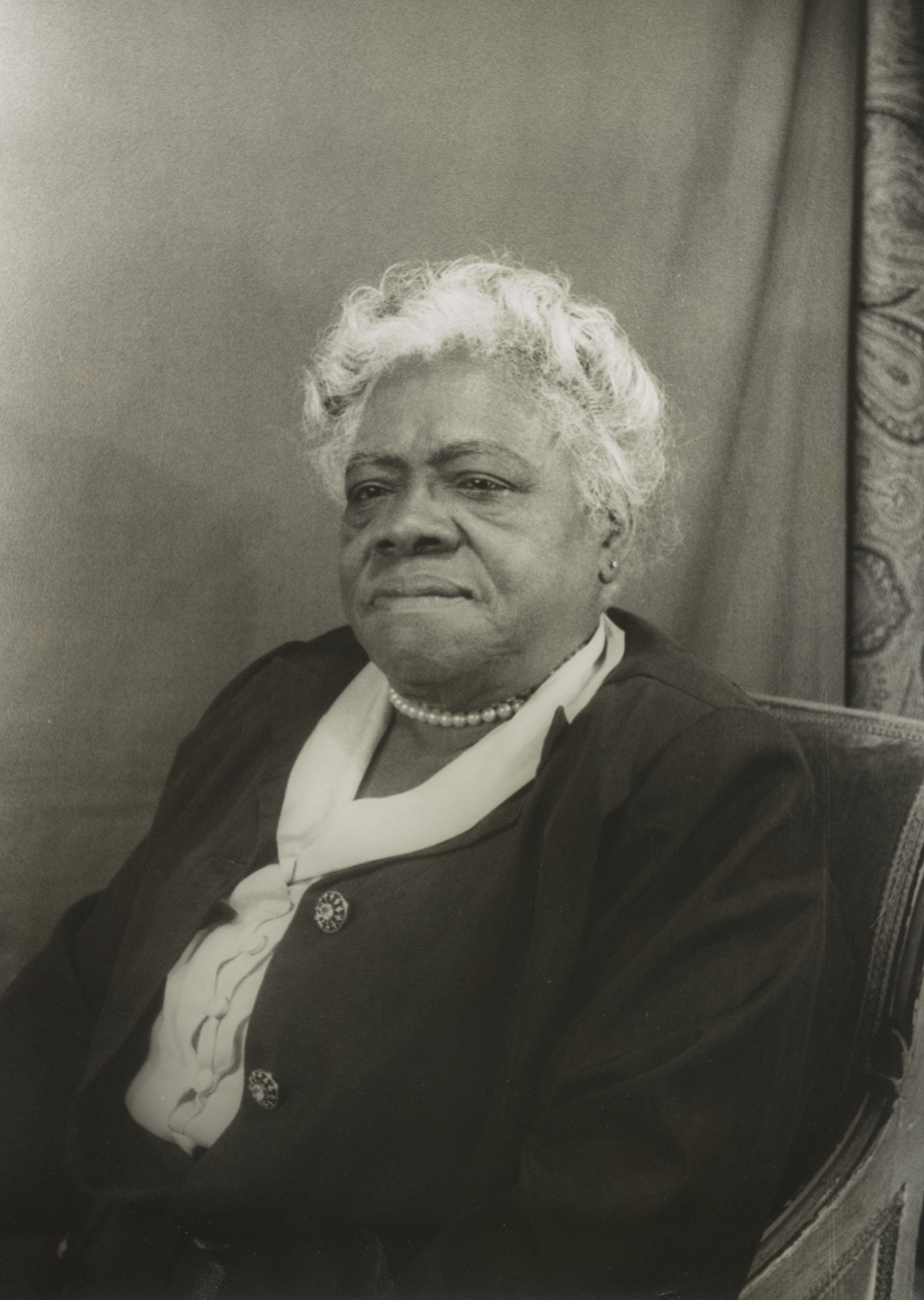
Civil rights activist Mary McLeod Bethune (1949) was an SCHW co-founder in 1938

On November 20, 1938, the Southern Conference for Human Welfare convened for the first time in the Municipal Auditorium of Birmingham, Alabama. Attendees numbered 1,200, a quarter of whom were African American. They included: First Lady Eleanor Roosevelt, United States Supreme Court Justice Hugo Black, Works Progress Administration director Aubrey Willis Williams, director within the National Youth Administration Mary McLeod Bethune, Highlander Folk School co-founder James Dombrowski, Alabama governor Bibb Graves, and activist Virginia Foster Durr. SCHW's "interracial nature was particularly unsettling for many white southerners" and experienced disruption by segregationists, leading to negative publicity in local newspapers. Eleanor Roosevelt defied local segregation ordinances at this founding meeting of the SCHW in Birmingham, against the advice of Eugene 'Bull' Connor.

=== Activities ===
Many politicians soon left the SCHW due to public perception as a Communist front. In her memoir, Virginia Durr recalled that the SCHW was "red-baited constantly." Attackers included prominent New York lawyer Morris Ernst of both the American Civil Liberties Union (ACLU) and National Lawyers Guild (NLG)–where Ernst had also led internal anti-communist efforts.

SCHW also experienced a "chronic shortage" of funding. It cancelled its 1939 convention. It had a hard time paying meager salaries to staff. After the end of World War II, celebrities (e.g., Frank Sinatra, Orson Welles) helped raise funding, which led to creation of a subsidiary Southern Conference Educational Fund (SCEF), an educational and non-political arm, headed by James Dombrowski of the Highlander Folk School. As SCEF formed, membership in SCHW declined. Labor unions, e.g., the American Federation of Labor (AFL) and the CIO, already facing pressure from new regulations in the 1947 Taft-Hartley Act, distanced themselves from the SCHW as a Communist-tainted, radical organization. Meanwhile, the SCHW refused to take a clear anti-Communist stance, which left it exposed to investigation by the House Un-American Activities Committee (HUAC) (and earlier Dies Committee). Even "stalwart supporters" like Eleanor Roosevelt distanced themselves.

=== Disbanding ===
During 1948, the SCHW split over its support for presidential candidate: some members supported Progressive Party candidate Henry A. Wallace, others the Democratic Party's incumbent US President Harry S. Truman. SCHW officers met in November 1948 and voted to end the floundering organization. On November 20, 1948, SCHW leaders met at Monticello, Virginia and passed a resolution to reformulate the organizations's last remaining group, the Southern Conference Educational Fund (SCEF), "committed solely to the ending of segregation in the south." Next day, November 21, 1948, SCHW leaders voted to disband.

== Works ==
- Southern Patriot (SCEF newspaper)

== See also ==
- Clifford Durr
- Virginia Durr
- Eleanor Roosevelt
- Franklin Delano Roosevelt
