= Emma Gelders Sterne =

American author (1894–1971)

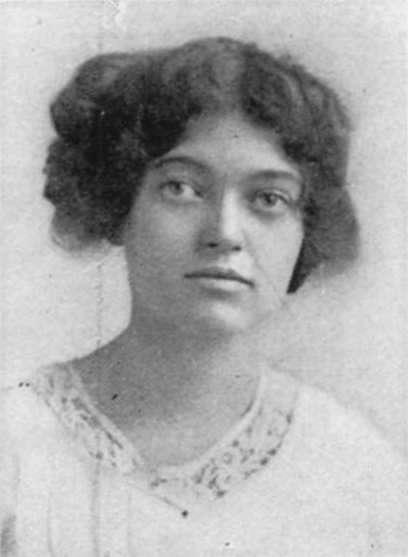
- Sterne in 1912
- Born: May 13, 1894; Birmingham, Alabama, US
- Died: August 29, 1971 (aged 77); San Jose, California, US
- Occupation: Author
- Relatives: Joseph Gelders (brother); Blanche Hartman (niece); Marge Frantz (niece)

Emma Gelders Sterne (May 13, 1894–August 29, 1971) was an American writer of children's books, with a historical and literary focus. Born in Alabama, she became involved in liberal causes which included women's suffrage and racial equality, issues she incorporated into some of her writing.

== Personal life ==
Sterne was of German-Jewish background, and was born in Birmingham, Alabama on May 13, 1894, to restaurateur Louis Gelders and Blanche Loeb. Her younger brother Joseph Gelders was a physicist, civil rights activist, and labor organizer. She grew up on nearby Red Mountain. She wrote for both her high school and college literary magazines, and graduated from Smith College in 1916. Back in Birmingham, she got involved in the women's suffrage movement, started a school for delinquent children, and became a newspaper columnist focusing on "women's issues".

Sterne said that when she was growing up she had never seen or heard "an educated color person. She had never even heard the name of a black man or woman who had done anything notable." In 1913, during her freshman year of college, she attended a speech by W.E.B. Du Bois, which marked a turning point in her life.

In 1917, she married Roy M. Sterne, a lawyer. They had two daughters, Ann and Barbara, and moved to New York. She studied writing at Columbia University and the New School for Social Research. She joined the ACLU, the NAACP, and the Democratic party, and identified herself as an atheist, raising concerns among her family and friends that she had become a Communist. Her brother began to get involved with politics, which she didn't agree with at first, but soon developed similar views, describing herself as a "left-liberal New Dealer". She joined the Communist Party in 1950 and began working with the Congress of Racial Equality.

She died in San Jose, California on August 29, 1971.

== Career ==
Sterne sold her first story in May 1923, and quickly produced two books for the popular All About series. She continued writing for the rest of her life, focusing on history and children's literature, which she combined in her historical adaptations for children, such as the legends of King Arthur, the biography Amarantha Gay, M.D., or Long Black Schooner: The Voyage of the Amistad. Topics related to social justice, such as Native American history and slavery, were recurring themes in her 44 books. Many of the books she cared the most about were written with the civil rights movement in mind. She was a school teacher, an elementary textbook editor, and then a children's book editor in the 1940s.

In 1954 and 1955 she published two picture books for small children, which were retellings of American Indian legends, under the pseudonym Emily Broun. From 1959 to 1966, she and her younger daughter Barbara Lindsay wrote the Kathy Martin series (about a nurse and amateur sleuth) of young adult novels, published under the pseudonym Josephine James.

== Partial bibliography ==
- All About Peter Pan (1924)
- All About Little Boy Blue (1924)
- Loud Sing Cuckoo (1930)
- Amarantha Gay, M.D. (1933)
- Drums of Monmouth (1935)
- The Calico Ball (1936)
- Some Plant Olive Trees (1937)
- European Summer (1938)
- The Pirate of Chatham Square (1939)
- America Was Like This (1940)
- We Live To Be Free (1942)
- Printer's Devil (1952)
- Long Black Schooner: The Voyage of the Amistad (1953), reprinted as The Slave Ship
- Let the Moon Go By, a Book of Tall Tales (1955)
- Blood Brothers: Four Men of Science (1959)
- I Have a Dream (1965)
- They Took Their Stand (1968)
- His Was the Voice: the Life of W.E.B. Du Bois (1971)

=== Kathy Martin books ===
with Barbara Lindsay

- A Cap for Kathy (1959)
- Junior Nurse (1960)
- Senior Nurse (1960)
- The Patient in 202 (1961)
- Assignment in Alaska (1961)
- Private Nurse (1962)
- Search for an Island (1963)
- Sierra Adventure (1964)
- Courage in Crisis (1964)
- Off-Duty Nurse (1964)
- An Affair of the Heart (1965)
- Peace Corps Nurse (1965)
- African Adventure (1965)
