= Aubrey Willis Williams =

American social and civil rights activist (1890–1965)

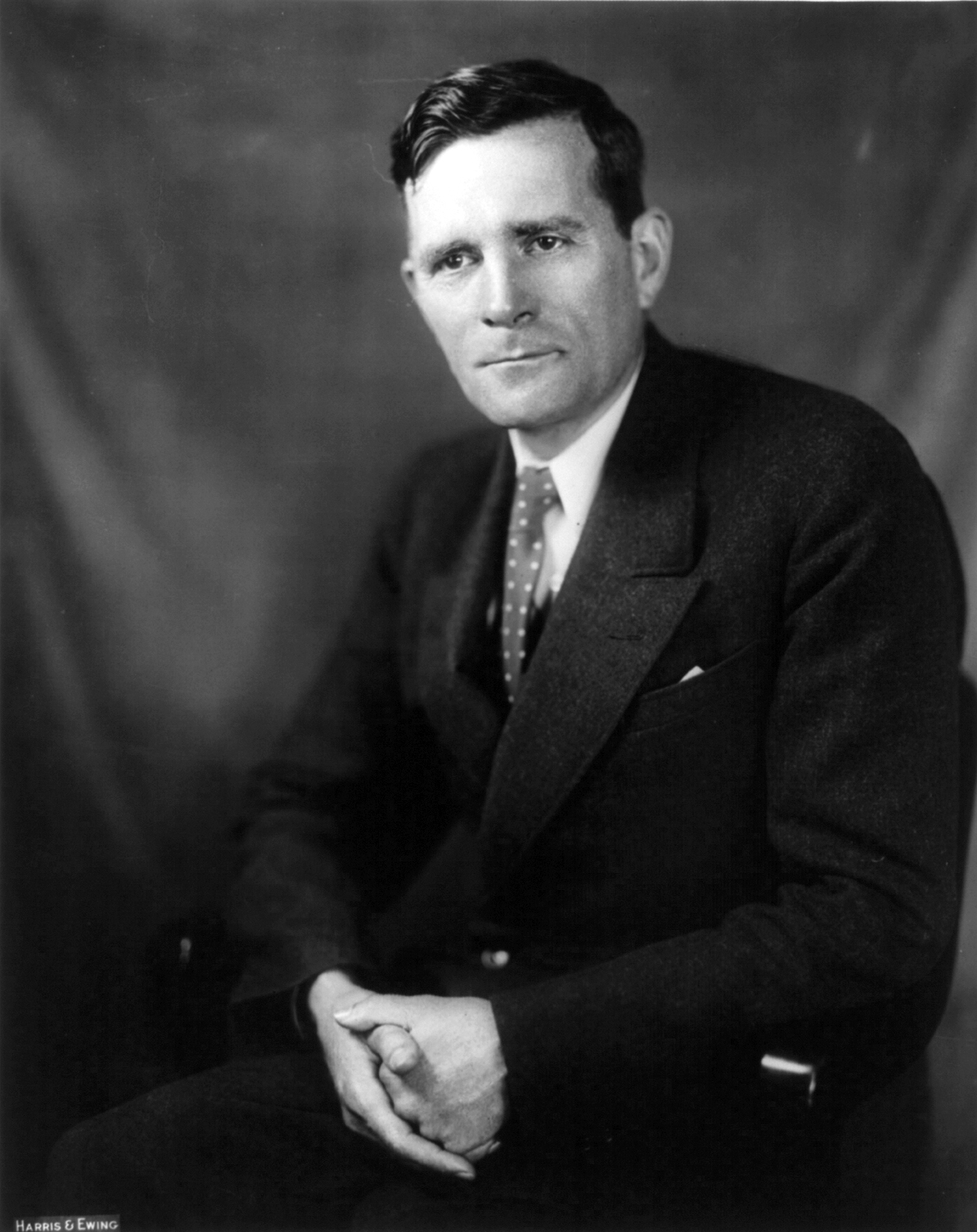
- Williams in 1938

Executive Director of the National Youth Administration
- In office June 26, 1935 – January 1, 1944
- Preceded by: Position established
- Succeeded by: Position abolished

Personal details
- Born: August 23, 1890 Springville, Alabama, U.S.
- Died: March 5, 1965 (aged 74)
- Party: Democratic
- Spouse: Anita Schreck (m. 1920)
- Children: 4
- Education: Maryville College; University of Cincinnati; University of Bordeaux

Aubrey Willis Williams (August 23, 1890 – March 5, 1965) was an American social and civil rights activist who headed the National Youth Administration during the New Deal.

== Early life and education ==
Aubrey Williams was born in Springville, Alabama, on August 23, 1890. He grew up in impoverished circumstances. His grandfather had been born relatively poor in North Carolina and migrated to Alabama, where he quickly accrued wealth and eventually became the owner of a successful plantation and a large number of slaves. He was, however, deeply troubled by the morality of slavery, and in 1855 voluntarily freed his workers. The rest of his property was nonetheless seized in the American Civil War, leaving the family destitute. Trained only for leisure, Aubrey Williams' father turned to manual labor, becoming a notably unsuccessful blacksmith. At the very young age of six, Aubrey went to work as a cash-boy in a Birmingham, Alabama department store. At times his whole family of four had to live on his $3.50 weekly wage.

As he grew older, Aubrey took on other jobs, while studying nights in a YMCA. He earned his way at Maryville College in Tennessee by painting signs, and at the University of Cincinnati by managing a Chautauqua, an early form of adult education. A post-War stay in France saw him earn a Doctorate from the University of Bordeaux. Not until he reached 30 was he ready to begin a career of social work in Ohio and Wisconsin.

== Political career ==
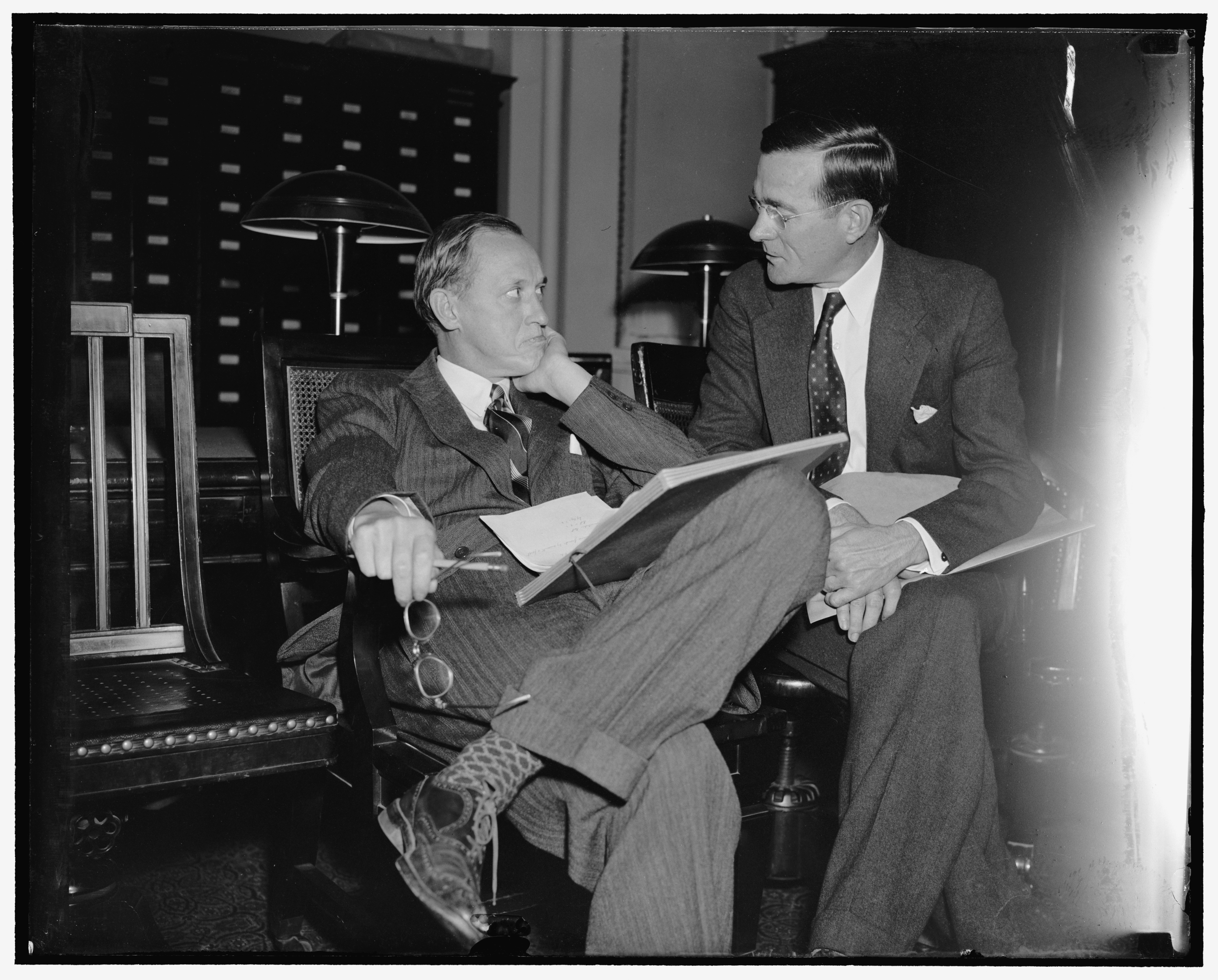
Williams (right) confers with Harry Hopkins in Washington, D.C., April 20, 1938

Williams' work led to his appointment by President Franklin D. Roosevelt to Assistant Federal Relief Administrator, the second highest ranking U.S. relief official. In this role, Williams reported to Harry Hopkins, one of President Roosevelt's closest advisers, and one of the architects of the New Deal. Hopkins directed the many relief programs of the Works Progress Administration (WPA), which he built into the largest employer in the country. In World War II he was Roosevelt's chief diplomatic advisor and troubleshooter, and was a key policy maker in the $50 billion Lend Lease program that sent aid to the allies.

During the mid-1930s, the New Deal had already accomplished much good for the vast number of unemployed, for farmers, for Artists and Writers, for Homeowners, Bank Depositors and Investors. By the spring of 1935 though, 20 percent of the nation’s twenty-two million youngsters remained out of school and either on relief or wandering the country looking for work. In 1937, the President stated: "I have determined, that we shall do something for the nation's unemployed Youth...." Beneficiaries would be all male and female youths aged 16 to 25 not regularly attending school.

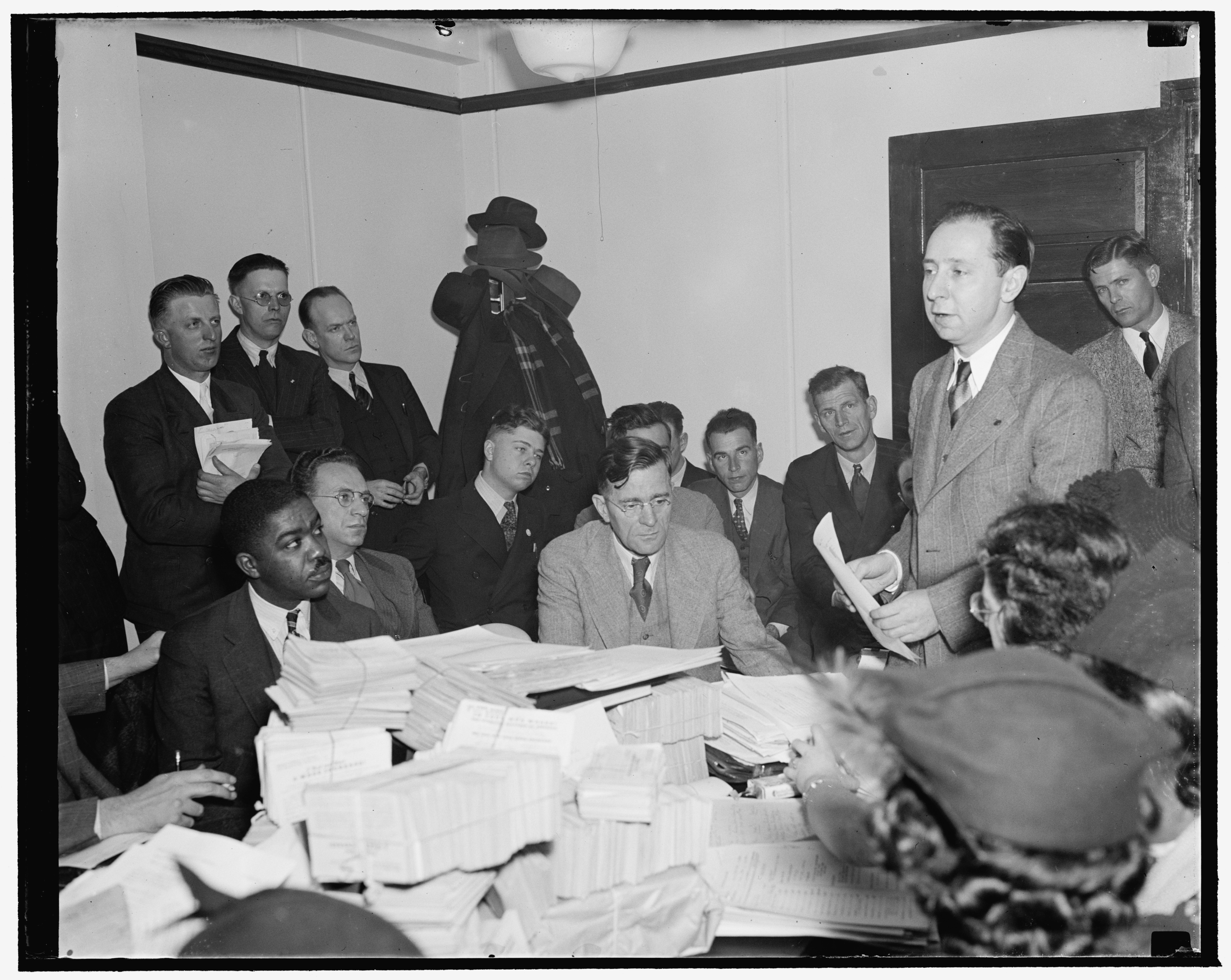
David Lasser (standing, right), leading a delegation of Works Progress Administration workers, protests relief cuts to Williams (seated, center), then Assistant WPA Administrator, December 15, 1938

Time magazine of that year announced: “By executive order the President forthwith created a National Youth Administration, with Aubrey Williams as executive director, [and] Assistant Secretary of the Treasury Josephine Roche as executive committee chairman. Following the usual New Deal formula, there were to be 48 State Youth Divisions under 48 State Youth Directors, plus Youth Committees in cities, towns, counties.” The young man selected as youth director for the state of Texas was the 26-year-old future president of the United States Lyndon Baines Johnson.

Johnson had begun his political career as the congressional secretary and assistant to Congressman Richard Mifflin Kleberg. In 1935 he left the service of Congressman Kleberg to become Texas state director of the National Youth Administration, headed by Aubrey Williams. During his tenure, the two men established a lasting friendship. In his new position, with headquarters in Austin, Texas, Johnson soon put an elaborate program into effect. Years later, a notable African American leader of the time reportedly said: "In the middle thirties we didn't know Lyndon Johnson from Adam," and continued, "We began to get word up here that there was one NYA director who wasn't like the others. He was looking after Negroes and poor folks and most NYA people weren't doing that." Johnson carried that same progressive spirit into his presidency, as exemplified in his War on Poverty program and the Great Society. It has also been said that these early youth programs were the inspiration for such Johnsonian initiatives as the Job Corps and Upward Bound.

Speaking before the NYA’s advisory committee on Oct. 27, 1941, a meeting attended by first lady Eleanor Roosevelt, Aubrey Williams stated “I must confess to all of you that I am thoroughly frightened,” further declaring, “I think we are fighting with our backs against the wall all over this country.” In the six years since its creation, the NYA had grown into the closest thing the country had ever had to a comprehensive national youth development program, providing millions of young people with jobs and job training, community service work, recreation, remedial education and real-life lessons in the benefits of democracy at a time when democracy was fighting for its life. But the agency had made powerful enemies – particularly, Washington’s education establishment. Months after the NYA’s advisory committee heard Williams’ warning in the East Room of the White House, the United States Congress cut the agency’s budget and debated killing it altogether. Within two years, the NYA was ended.

President Franklin Roosevelt in 1945 nominated Williams to run the Rural Electrification Administration, but his history of fighting racial discrimination in federal programs made him a target of Southern senators, who blocked confirmation.

== Later career ==
Williams returned to Alabama to work in civil rights organizations, but U.S. Sen. James Eastland used a public hearing of the House Un-American Activities Committee to attack Williams, who had been subpoenaed to appear. Williams had denied ever being a communist, but his New Deal work and commitment to fighting racism and poverty made him a target for the charge, especially from Southern white supremacists eager to uphold racial oppression by connecting integrationists with communism. In the early 1960s, Alabama Gov. George Wallace took up the task, using a 1957 photograph that showed the Rev. Martin Luther King Jr. and Williams seated side-by-side to charge King and the civil rights movement with communist connections and motives.

In 1955, Williams provided bail money to African American activists during the Montgomery Bus Boycott.

In 1957, during the Little Rock Crisis, he wholeheartedly expressed his support for Eisenhower's deployment of federal troops, even cabling him:

"you are finding out what many of us in the South have known for a long time, that the only time states rights are used is to obstruct the rights of minorities which are powerless and have practically no rights or protection under so called states rights. . . . As a Southerner whose people lost everything they had in the 1860s, I wish to thank you and to express deepest gratitude to you for the firm stand you have taken."

In 1963, he joined Martin Luther King Jr. on his March on Washington.

== Personal life ==
He married his wife, Anita Schreck, on December 20, 1920. They had four sons.

== Notes ==
Aubrey Willis Williams served for 10 years as executive secretary of the Wisconsin Conference of Social Work. He also served as an officer of the Southern Conference Education Fund.

It was probably his service with the Southern Conference for Human Welfare that resulted in his not being ratified by the Senate to the Rural Electrification Administration.

He opposed the Vietnam War, expressing as much to the newly re-elected President Johnson in 1965. The following is an excerpt from the book Pillar of Fire (pg. 384), written by Taylor Branch:

"From his sick bed, dying of Cancer, Aubrey Williams scrawled a “Dear Lyndon” letter to his rambunctious protégé of the New Deal era. He instructed the President that if he received the letter and did not find it “worth answering, do not send me one of those synthetic letters that somebody signs for you.”

"What I want to say and I feel I speak for the majority of the American people is do not get the country involved in South East Asia. Dulles made mistakes in history. Agree to a conference and withdraw. It is costing 2 million dollars a day. All men want individual freedom. It may take time to work out, but Roosevelt had poise, understood human nature, and gave it a chance."

In his reply, Johnson assured his old mentor that he “would never reply to him synthetically”, adding that he believed his Asia policy to be “the correct one.”
