= National Youth Administration =

U.S. New Deal agency during the presidency of Franklin D. Roosevelt

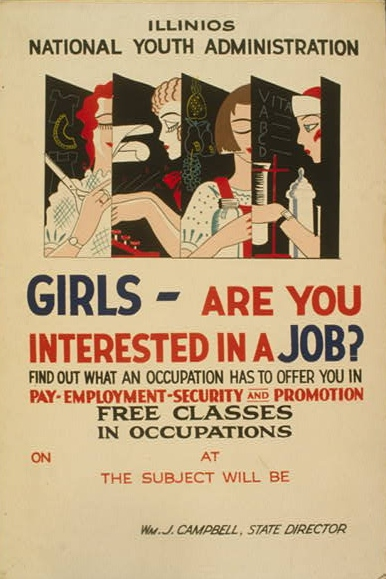
Poster for the Illinois branch of the National Youth Administration, 1937. "Illinois" is misspelled.

The National Youth Administration (NYA) was a New Deal agency sponsored by Franklin D. Roosevelt during his presidency. It focused on providing work and education for Americans between the ages of 16 and 25. It operated from June 26, 1935, to 1939 as part of the Works Progress Administration (WPA) and included a Division of Negro Affairs headed by Mary McLeod Bethune, who worked at the agency from 1936 to 1943. Following the passage of the Reorganization Act of 1939, the NYA was transferred from the WPA to the Federal Security Agency. In 1942, the NYA was transferred to the War Manpower Commission (WMC). The NYA was discontinued in 1943.

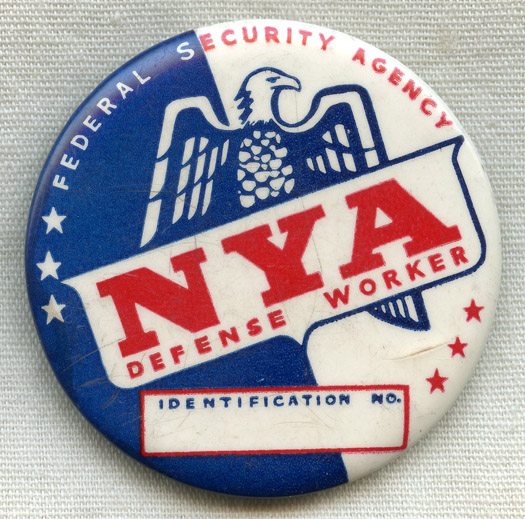
Badge belonging to a National Youth Administration Defense Worker

By 1938, college youth were paid from $30 to $40 a month for "work study" projects at their schools. Another 155,000 boys and girls from relief families were paid $10 to $25 a month for part-time work that included job training. Unlike the Civilian Conservation Corps, it included young women. The youth normally lived at home, and worked on construction or repair projects. Its annual budget was approximately $580 million.

The NYA was headed by Aubrey Willis Williams, a prominent liberal from Alabama who was close to Harry Hopkins and Eleanor Roosevelt. The head of the Texas division at one point was Lyndon B. Johnson, who was later to become president of the United States.

The NYA operated several programs for out-of-school youth.

== Origins ==
As the Great Depression continued to grip the American economy and inhibit the harnessing of American potential, unemployment and poverty spiraled to record highs. These debilitating years saw youth unemployment rise to 30% and the younger cohorts of the United States increasingly faced the devastation of not being able to afford education. Serving as the main catalyst for change and accelerator for government intervention, Eleanor Roosevelt advocated government involvement. In 1934 she notably declared that she frequently experienced "moments of real terror when [she thought] we might be losing this generation". Mrs. Roosevelt was an initiator of the National Youth Administration as well as its adviser, a planner, an investigator, and a publicist. Halfway through the depression, due to the change in tides as a result of World War II, Roosevelt had mixed opinions on the NYA. Roosevelt felt that the United States should send the majority of these workers to serve in the war. This resulted in FDR beginning to lean towards Congress to shut it down. Due to Eleanor Roosevelt's intuition regarding the decline of progress within the American youth, she urged her husband to allow her to "act as an extension of the presidency by moving in new directions or in areas where it was politically difficult for the President to operate directly." These "difficult areas" in which it was difficult for FDR to operate directly pointed towards the youth in America. Eleanor Roosevelt's efforts and contributions gave the American youth various opportunities including education, jobs, recreation, and counseling for male and female youth between the ages of sixteen and twenty-five.

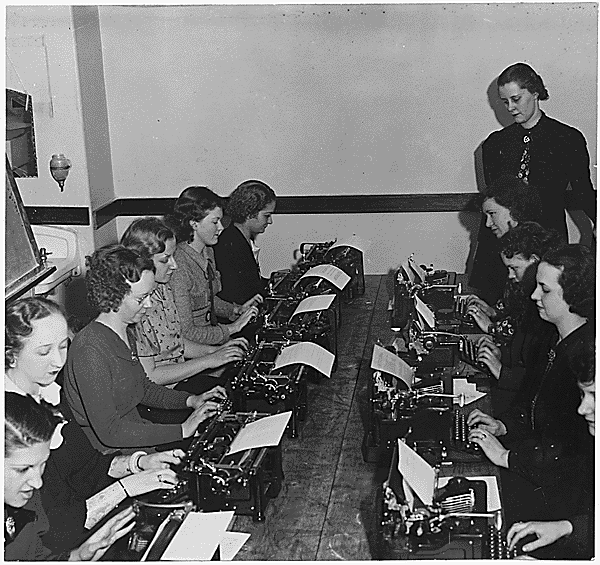
National Youth Administration was a Vocational Guidance—brush-up classes to improve typing ability (Illinois).

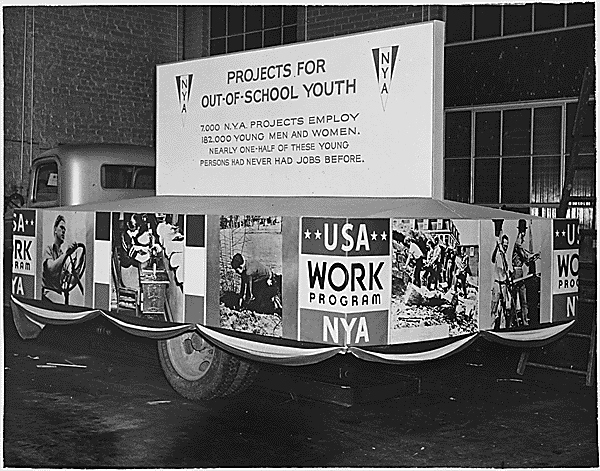
NYA float, "Projects for Out-of-School Youth", Inaugural Parade, Washington, D.C., January 20, 1937

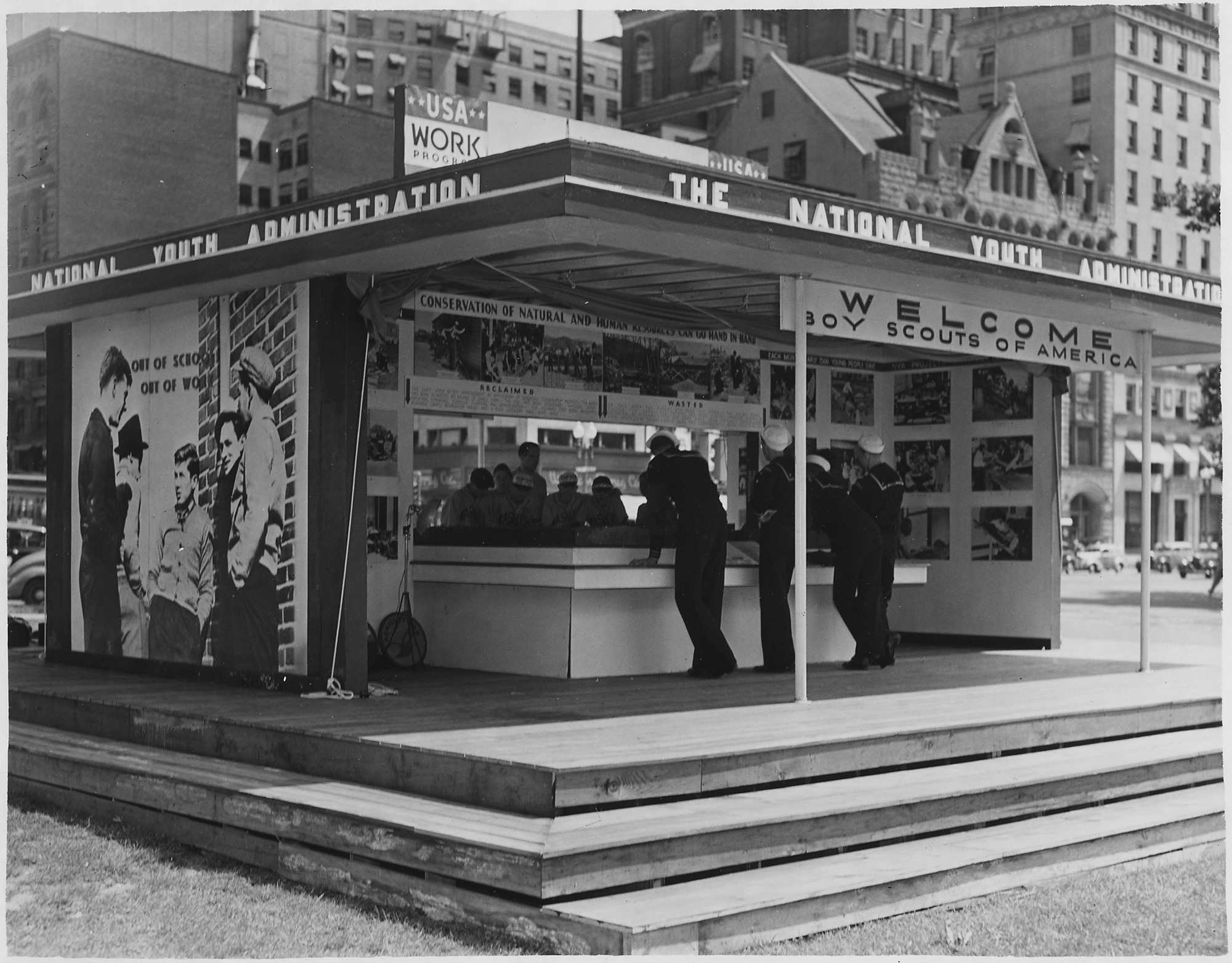
NYA-exhibit Welcome Boy Scouts of America-conservation of natural and human resources

== Creation ==
In June 1935, to combat the economic forces that entangled youth and their families, the National Youth Administration was launched by Executive Order 7086. Much like the Federal Writers' Project, created just over a month later, the federal agency was intended to assist young Americans during the tumultuous times, to prevent them from falling victim to current hardships, and to maintain their potential for future achievement and societal contribution. The NYA's first mission embodied the goal to prevent already-enrolled high school and university students from dropping out before earning their degree, out of necessity due to dire financial times. The agency achieved this by providing grants to youth in exchange for part-time work positions in various sectors of the education system, including administration, janitorial work, and cafeteria services. These efforts stemmed from a twofold mission to develop the youth's talent, while simultaneously keeping them from flooding the already-suffering and compromised labor markets. Aubrey Williams, who headed the Administration, felt that the solution to the problem youth faced was to give these teenagers and young adults socially useful and constructive work so that they may become assets rather than liabilities to society.

Secondly, the NYA was committed to providing training and employment for long-term value and advancement. Young people were provided with work experience and learning-by-doing training in a wide variety of fields, including recreation, public service, education, the arts, research and development, agriculture, and construction. By 1937, more than 400,000 youth were employed or participating in occupational training under the NYA. These vocational programs and occupational placements were put to the ultimate test with the onset of World War II. The 1939 outbreak of war in Europe provided the perfect testing grounds to observe the effectiveness of NYA's training and initiatives in many fields that were related to the war economy. The war effort increased the program's reach and saw a substantial surge in young, trained workers contributing to the defense industry. On a larger scale, the program enabled American youth to contribute to the war effort, stimulate the American war economy, and effectively turn the United States into an international powerhouse of production.

== Aubrey Williams ==
The NYA was also fundamental in bringing considerations for African Americans into the dialogue surrounding aid to workers and maturing youth. This platform was strongly pushed by Aubrey Williams' leadership in the agency. He was a forerunner in addressing unemployment and access to education among African Americans, creating the Office of Minority Affairs. His goals emphasized increasing their economic well-being through labor opportunities, increased educational attainment, and maximizing potential.

More generally, Williams was influential in emphasizing the program's broad reach and positive implications on the future. His public addresses adamantly expressed that the transition youth experienced when adjusting from elementary years to greater independence and work positions was always rough, yet the economic situation of the Depression aggravated the transition and threatened to derail reaching final aspirations of work. Consequentially, it was the NYA's duty to provide access to education, advancement, and sense of occupational achievement through its interactive initiatives and agendas. Williams' emphasis on turning America's youth into productive citizens was further supported by President Franklin Roosevelt's proclamation that the "yield on this investment [the establishment of the NYA] should be high." Providing the youth with the foundation they needed would enable them to contribute to America's future development, the nation's strength, and progress and acceleration forward.

== Opportunities for the Youth ==
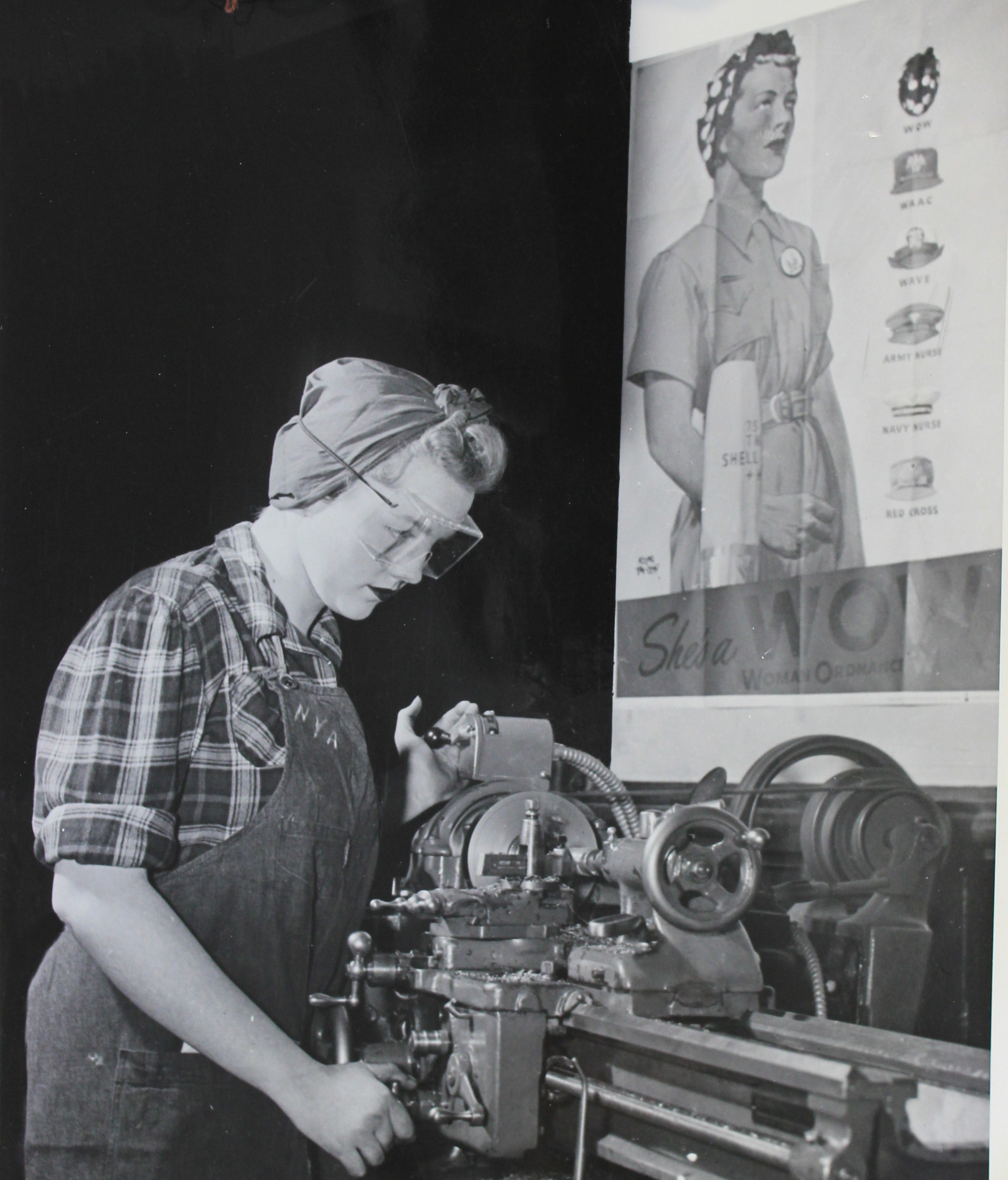
NYA female ordnance worker

The Federal Government, through the combined efforts of the National Youth Administration and the Civilian Conservation Corps, provided work for nearly 5 million youth during the Great Depression and World War II years. These figures included more than one million young women. By the end of June 1938, the National Youth Administration had constructed 125 schools and libraries, as well as improved and made repairs on an additional 4,459. NYA constructed 59 gymnasiums and dormitories, repairing another 233. Youth contributed to the construction of 74 warehouses, courthouses, offices, and administration buildings, along with repairing 352. In addition to buildings, NYA workers also built 5,149 athletic fields, baseball fields, and grandstands, along with the improvement of 12,697 more. In addition, NYA created over two thousand handball and tennis courts and improved an additional two thousand.

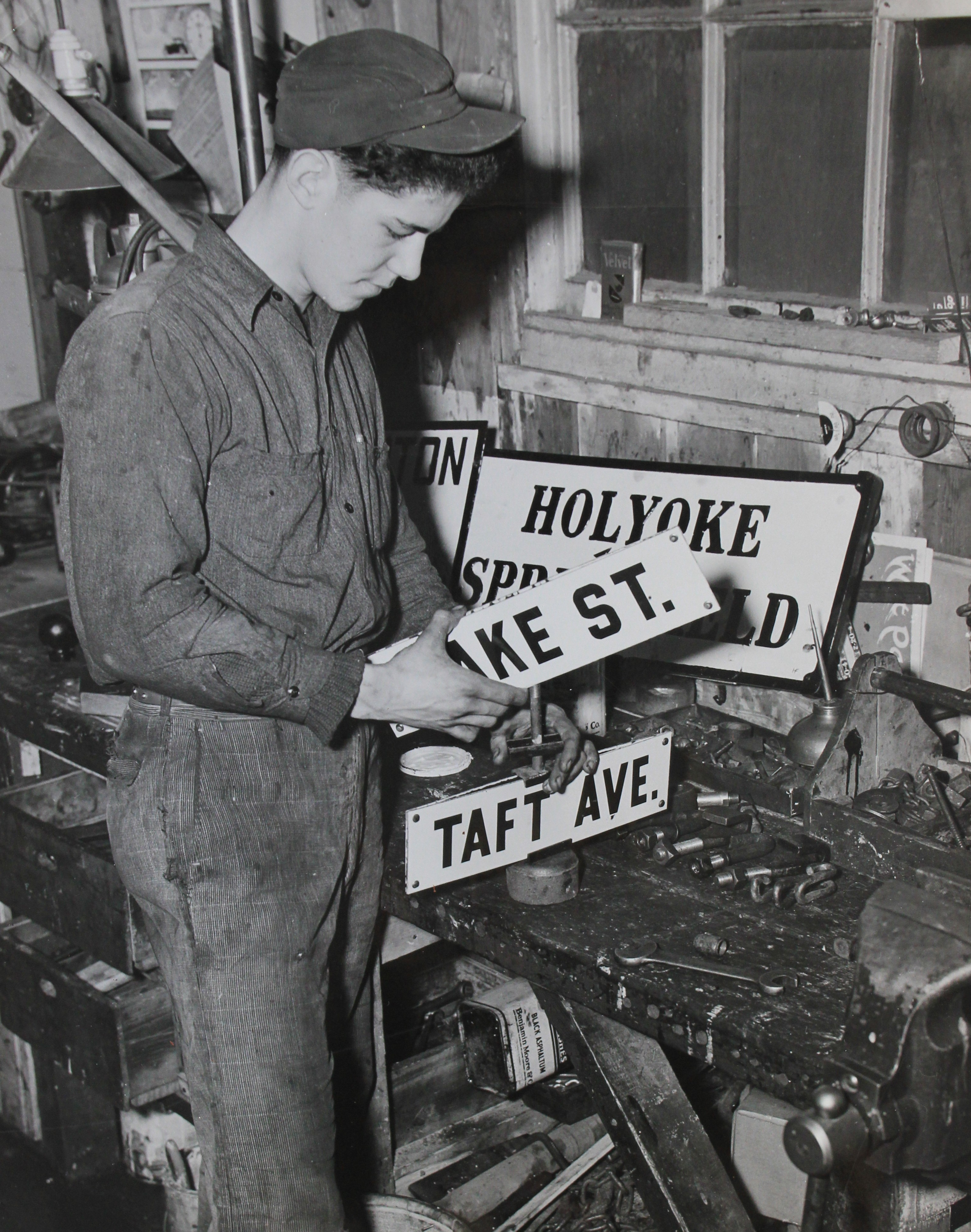
NYA worker assembling street signs

The NYA also trained youth in various workshop skills. They built or renovated over 481,000 pieces of various furniture, repaired almost 1 million toys, and salvaged or crafted about 26,000 pieces of playground equipment, 177,344 pieces of mechanical equipment, and over 853,000 articles made of concrete, such as concrete blocks for building. Over 9.5 million feet of highways and roads were built by the groups of male youth, along with almost 4 million feet of road shoulders. Nearly 2 million feet of sidewalks and paths were built by these young men.

Young women were just as influential as male youth. They made up about 43 percent of the National Youth Administration's total enrollment. Their accomplishments included serving over 31 million lunches to school children, making over 2.5 million articles for hospital supplies, and producing over 3 million articles of clothing for distribution to needy families.

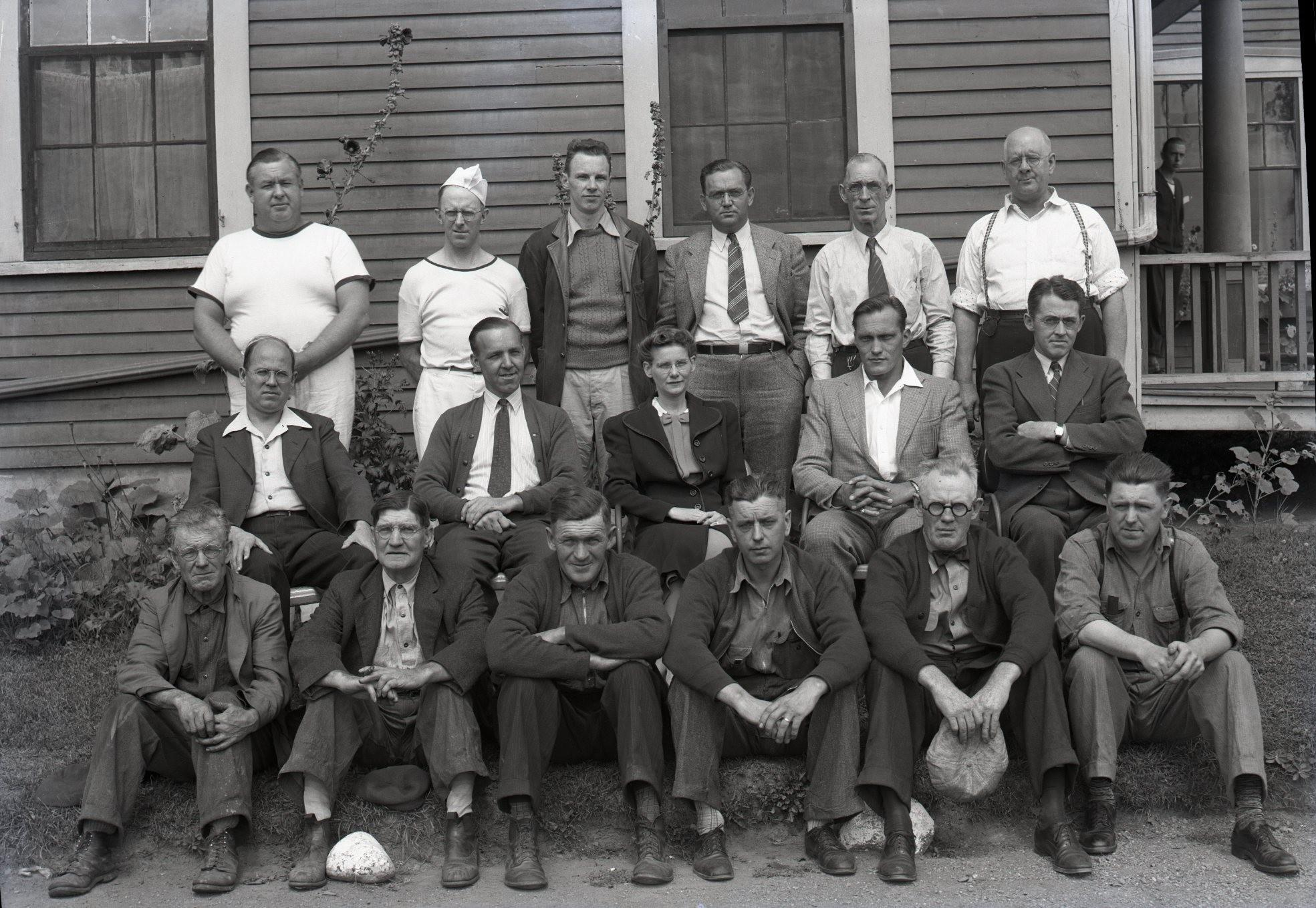
National Youth Administration staff members, Dexter, Maine

== End of the NYA ==
As the home effort of World War II gained momentum, the NYA's crucial role quickly dwindled. The booming munitions and war industry economy was recruiting large numbers of workers, and the agency was no longer vital for ensuring work opportunity and growth among the population. This was specifically true for lesser-skilled workers who previously needed a support network to secure work or the skills needed to get their careers under way.

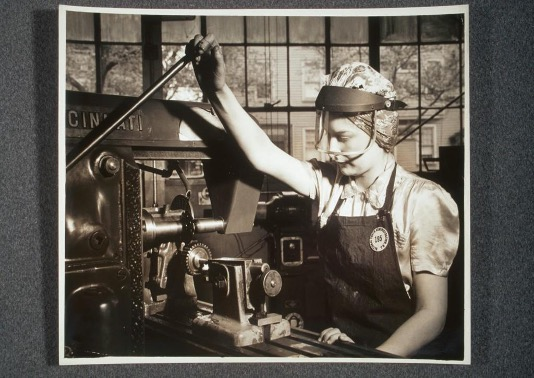
NYA woman

The program officially ended on January 1, 1944, per the Labor-Federal Security Appropriations Act of 1944 and the Second Deficiency Appropriations Act of 1943. The various impacts which came from the program were immense; with having employed 2,677,000 young men and women in its out-of-school work program and 2,134,000 in its student work program.

== Achievements and legacy ==
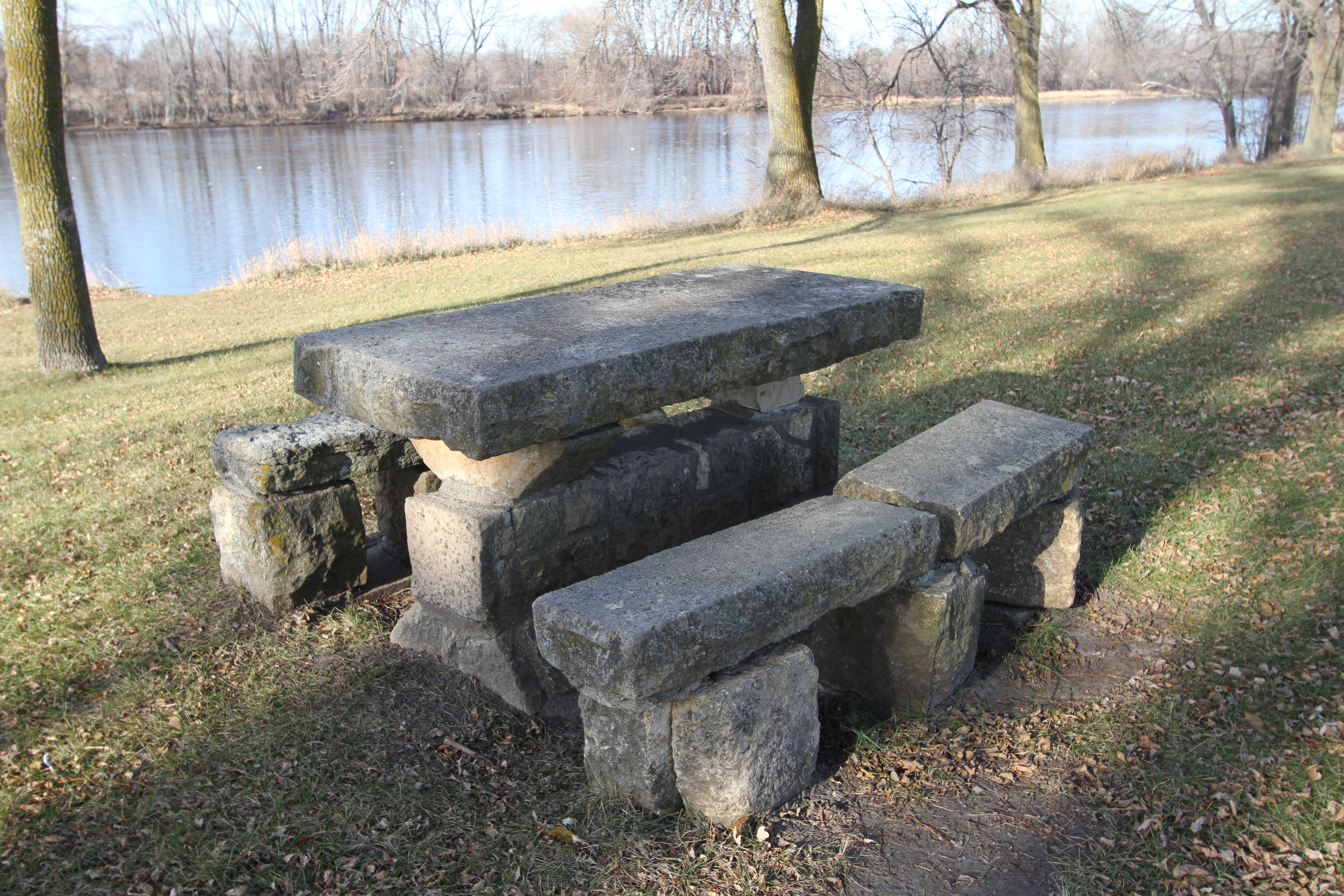
NYA stone picnic table in Babcock Wayside on the Mississippi River in Minnesota

Overall, the NYA helped over 4.5 million American youths find jobs, receive vocational training, and afford higher standards of education. More significantly, it provided the means necessary for this "struggling generation" to overcome the economic adversity that threatened to overrun the country. Through the NYA's initiatives, the youth triumphed and maintained their dignity by contributing to society, growing personally, and stimulating advancements in America that eventually proved crucial to pulling the country out of a period of domestic strife.

The NYA had positive effects on the skilled labor supply, decreased the proportions of mismatched workers and employers, and improved America's capacity for production, growth, and economic stimulation. During other times of economic hardship, unemployment, and fears of declining education, activists have agitated for a similar program to be reestablished.

== See also ==
- American Youth Congress—The influential youth organization that fomented the creation of the NYA
- National Commission on Resources for Youth—A government project focused on youth development
