= Women's poll tax repeal movement =

Movement to abolish US poll taxes

History of poll taxes as a condition to voting

The women's poll tax repeal movement was a movement in the United States, predominantly led by women, that attempted to secure the abolition of poll taxes as a prerequisite for voting in the Southern states. The movement began shortly after the ratification in 1920 of the Nineteenth Amendment to the United States Constitution, which granted suffrage to women. Before obtaining the right to vote, women were not obliged to pay the tax, but shortly after the Nineteenth Amendment became law, Southern states began examining how poll tax statutes could be applied to women. For example, North and South Carolina exempted women from payment of the tax, while Georgia did not require women to pay it unless they registered to vote. In other Southern states, the tax was due cumulatively for each year someone had been eligible to vote.

Payment of the tax was difficult for Black, Hispanic, and women voters, primarily because their incomes were much lower than those of white men. For married women, coverture prevented them from controlling their own assets. Recognizing that payment of the tax as a prerequisite to voting could lead to their disenfranchisement, women began organizing themselves in the 1920s to repeal the poll tax laws, but the movement did not gain much traction until the Great Depression in the 1930s. Both black and white women pressed at state and national levels for legislative action to abolish laws that required paying to vote. Poll taxes were a fixed tax that citizens had to pay in order to vote. This prevented and suppressed certain groups of individuals from voting. These taxes were common in states like Georgia, Alabama, Mississippi, Virginia, and Texas. Some states had poll taxes that would add up overtime for several years before a person could vote. In addition, women filed a series of lawsuits to try to effect change. By the 1950s, the intersection of sexist and racist customs and law was apparent to those fighting the poll tax. This created collaborations between activists involved in the poll tax movement and those active in the broader civil rights movement.

Louisiana abandoned its poll tax law in 1932, and the number of women voters increased by 77 percent. Women's activism helped bring about the repeal of poll tax legislation in Florida in 1937, in Georgia in 1945, in Tennessee in 1953, and in Arkansas in 1964. That year, the Twenty-fourth Amendment to the United States Constitution was passed, prohibiting poll taxes as a barrier to voting in federal elections. Passage of the Voting Rights Act of 1965 gave federal authority to the Department of Justice to institute lawsuits against the four states that still used poll tax to disenfranchise voters in state elections. The Supreme Court finally settled the four-decades-long struggle, abolishing the requirement to pay poll tax to be able to vote in any election, federal or state, in their ruling on Harper v. Virginia State Board of Elections in 1966.

== Background ==
When the initial governing documents of the United States were created between 1776 and 1789, they established prerequisites for casting a ballot. After the passage of the Constitution in 1789, ownership of real estate was the primary requirement for voting. As the merchant class grew, modifications were made, instead requiring ownership of personal property of a certain value. By the end of the American Civil War in 1865, property requirements had been abolished in almost every state. In 1875, with the passage of a poll tax law in Virginia, a precedent was established for using tax legislation as a means of restricting the franchise. Between 1890 and 1900, similar legislation requiring payment of a poll tax as a prerequisite for voting became common across the South. By 1914, the constitutions of 22 states allowed for the collection of poll taxes and in 14 states the tax was a prerequisite for voting.

One of the reasons for the adoption of poll tax laws in the Progressive Era was the rise of the leftist, agrarian Populist Party, which was seen as a threat to the prevailing two-party system, in particular to the Democratic Party. As Abraham Lincoln's Republican Party had traditionally been the party with which blacks affiliated, the rise of organized, discontented small farmers was seen as a bigger challenge to political power at the turn of the century. In principle, poll taxes were adopted to ensure that eligible voters had sufficient financial independence to prove they were qualified and their vote could not be bought. In practice, they were often used to disenfranchise blacks and poor whites, in order to maintain supportive constituencies for business and political interests. The ramifications were deeper than political disenfranchisement, because in states where juries were selected from those on the electoral roll, those who could not pay poll taxes were also denied the opportunity to serve or have their case evaluated by their peers. (Note: Trial by a jury of one's peers is a concept enshrined in English law by virtue of Magna Carta and in U.S. law through the Sixth Amendment to the United States Constitution. It is designed to ensure that persons accused of a crime have impartial fellow citizens weighing the evidence presented at trial. It is also designed to curtail the power of the state and agents of the law, who enforce compliance with legal statutes.) As women could not vote, the tax did not apply to them until 1920, when the passage of the Nineteenth Amendment to the United States Constitution legally enfranchised them.

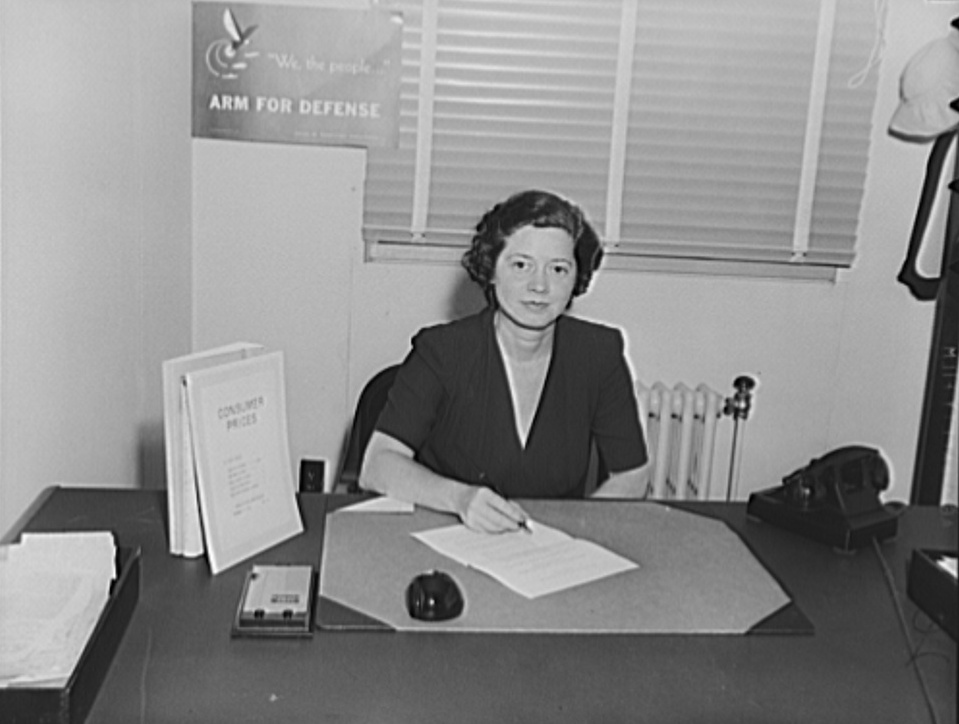
May Thompson Evans, c. 1940

After the passage of the Nineteenth Amendment, states that had poll tax as a prerequisite for voting responded in different ways. Some states exempted women entirely, others defined women's obligations equally with men's, while still others left the ambiguity in the law as an open question. In Georgia, married women had no separate legal identity; as payment of poll tax for women was seen as an extra burden on their spouse, women were exempted if they chose not to register to vote. In North Carolina, women agitated for the abolition of the tax and were instrumental in obtaining both an exemption for women from payment and its repeal from the state constitution in 1920. Although North Carolinians had won their fight, Carolinian activists involved in the Women's Division of the Democratic National Committee, such as May Thompson Evans, continued to press for poll tax repeal in other states. In South Carolina, women's groups took an opposite approach to those in most of the South. Exempted from paying poll taxes, they fought for at least a decade to have the tax imposed upon women as recognition of their equal status. (Note: Repeal of the poll tax as a prerequisite to voting in South Carolina was approved by voters in 1950 and adopted by the legislature as an amendment to the state constitution in 1951.)

The amount of tax was typically $1 to $2 per year (equivalent to $30 to $60 in 2025), increased in some areas by cumulative tax, (Note: For example, Nolen Breedlove, the plaintiff in Breedlove v. Suttles was required to pay 7 years of unpaid taxes to register in Georgia in 1936. Voters in Alabama could be charged up to 24 years in arrears, as they were required to pay from the time they became eligible to vote at age 21 until they reached age 45, prior to the maximum arrears being restricted to 2 years in 1953.) interest, and penalties for each year a voter had not paid but was eligible to vote; it disproportionately impacted women voters. Coverture (Note: The first statute to define citizenship and naturalization in the United States was the Naturalization Act of 1790. While it did not preclude women from citizenship, the legal system of the United States had absorbed coverture from English law. Under this practice, the control of the physical body of a married woman, and thus any rights to her person or property, belonged to her husband and her loyalty to her spouse was considered to be more important than her obligation to the state. Ending coverture in the United States required a lengthy process of legislation through several decades. Judicial rulings on domestic relations held that infants, slaves, and women were unable to participate in public life, because they lacked discernment and the right to free will and property. To ensure proper behavior and morality, conflicts of loyalty were to be avoided. Until 1922, when the Cable Act was passed, a woman in the United States was required to give up her citizenship in favor of her husband's on marriage. Amendments to the Cable Act continued until 1940, when married women were granted their own nationality without restriction. Until the 1960s, differences in legislation between the states gave women extremely different civil rights depending upon their residency; over time the federal system gave them additional rights in certain areas. Remnants of coverture remained in U.S. law even after passage of the Equal Pay Act of 1963, eliminating wage disparity on the basis of sex and the Civil Rights Act of 1964, which forbade discrimination on the basis of race, color, religion, sex, or national origin. Married women were unable to obtain credit in their own names and single women were denied credit on the basis that they were unmarried until the passage of the Equal Credit Opportunity Act in 1974. Until 1975 married women were legally obligated in every state to allow their husbands access to their bodies for sex. That year, New York state passed legislation removing the requirement. Birthright citizenship derived from the mother for children born abroad before 1934 was not confirmed until 1989.) prevented women from legally accessing money without their husband's consent and in some cases wages earned by wives belonged to their spouse. As men controlled the funds available to pay poll taxes, they could withhold payment for their wives. In cases where women had access to funds, they were disadvantaged as the proportion of their income required to pay the tax was greater as women earned far less than men. For example, white men's median income in the U.S. in 1949 was $2,255 and in 1959 was $3,734. In those years, the median income of non-white males was $1,221 and $1,906 respectively, while white women earned $1,171 and $1,499 and non-white women earned $530 and $737.

== Overview of the movement ==
=== Development ===
Several court cases in the early 1920s resulted in a legal consensus that the Nineteenth Amendment allowed enforcement of the national law without actually amending state legal codes. In other words, the federal amendment overrode state law, effectively striking out the word "male" from any state law defining a voter by gender. One of the first legal cases involving poll tax in the South was Graves v. Eubank (87 So. 587, 205 Ala. 174, January 13, 1921) in Montgomery County, Alabama. Mary Lou Graves attempted to pay her poll tax to enable her to register for the next election. The tax collector, A. H. Eubank, refused to take her payment, prompting Graves to sue. The Supreme Court of Alabama concurred with Graves that she could not be denied the right to pay the tax and register.

By the early 1920s, some women had begun to form anti-poll tax groups, but for many women the goal in the years following enfranchisement was to register women and to encourage payment of the tax. Though they identified an inability to pay poll taxes as an obstacle, most women activists did not strive for its abolition. It was not until the 1930s that women's organizations throughout the South were involved in state and national efforts to repeal poll tax legislation. Breedlove v. Suttles (302 U.S. 277, 284), a major US Supreme Court case heard in 1937, determined that though the Georgia election poll tax statute imposed the tax on both men and women, women who chose not to register to vote were exempt from paying. The decision confirmed that voting rights were determined by the rules established by individual states, rather than by the federal government. Thus, if states established paying tax as a prerequisite to registering, it was within their constitutional authority. As Georgia law required payment of the tax for his spouse from the man who was the head of a family, paying tax twice was seen as an extra financial burden on him. Non-payment also allowed women to opt out of civic responsibilities to concentrate on motherhood. The ruling reinforced the view that women were second class citizens and the legal dependents of men. It solidified the constitutionality of poll tax collection as a voting prerequisite for federal and state elections for nearly three decades.

Black and white women activists in the poll tax movement often worked together, as did the organizations they represented. People contacting the National Association for the Advancement of Colored People (NAACP) for information on voting or citizenship were provided with materials developed by the League of Women Voters, which also held citizenship training in conjunction with the National Association of Colored Women's Clubs. Granting women the vote had undermined the separation of the races, as the presence of white women, registering and voting in the same election facilities as black men and women, had a restraining effect on white men's intimidation of black would-be voters. In 1920 in Richmond, Virginia, The News Leader carried a story about how black and white women were helping each other to understand the requirements to register to vote. Even so, the majority of white women did not challenge segregation policies.

=== Women and organizations involved ===
The motivations of women in the movement differed. Some came to the anti-tax movement from former work with women's suffrage, some from labor union activism aimed at improving working conditions for women, and others from the early civil rights movement. Unlike the single-focus on women's rights by elite white middle- and upper-class activists of earlier women's organizations, activists involved in the movement to repeal poll taxes acknowledged the racial component of the struggle. According to the historian Rachel Gunter, activists "strategically deployed (and refrained from deploying) racial arguments when it best suited their cause". White women used white men's negrophobia in their arguments for why poll taxes should be abolished. Their reasoning was that if white women could vote then white voters would outnumber black, securing white political power. Activists stressed that if the majority white voters did decline because of poll tax repeal, white supremacy would still be protected by other disenfranchising policies, especially literacy tests (Note: Literacy tests were enacted to confirm that potential voters could read. It was essentially a means of eliminating potential voters who were uneducated, which was usually because they were poor. The tests were often arbitrarily applied to people of color, rural voters likely to have limited education, women, and foreigners. They could include questions such as "How many bubbles are in a bar of soap?" or asking a potential voter to interpret a section of the state constitution. Literacy tests were not limited to Southern states, but existed throughout the United States to disenfranchise Native Alaskans and American Indians; Hispanics in the Southwest and Western United States, as well as Puerto Ricans on the East Coast; and non-English speaking Asian-Americans. Passage of the Voting Rights Act of 1965 allowed the federal government oversight to override discriminatory literacy tests.) and white primaries. (Note: White primaries were abolished by the U.S. Supreme Court ruling in Smith v. Allwright in 1944.) This was shown to be the case in states which abolished the tax. In some cases, cross-racial groups found that building a support base for legal change required black women in the South to work in the background, allowing white women to lead, so that their agenda was not threatening to white males.

For black women, suffrage was only part of the struggle to eliminate inequality. Members of the National Association of Colored Women's Clubs campaigned against Jim Crow laws – legal statutes regulating and enforcing racial segregation in the United States. They also protested lynching and peonage, and worked to encourage voting. Intimidation and violence were used to prevent blacks from registering to vote and they were routinely threatened by armed vigilantes. Despite the risks, African Americans continued to press for their rights, using what influence they had and various networks to exert a degree of control within their communities. By organizing petitions and letter drives to political leaders, and testifying at legislative hearings, they attempted to sway public policy. Using their personal connections, church groups, and women's organizations, they tried to gain access to policymakers. They also created educational materials about issues and distributed them as handbills, in newspapers or magazines, or at public lectures, hoping to apply pressure to political leaders. Though there were cases of black men who did not support women's push for voting, there was widespread support among African Americans. Black husbands generally welcomed female enfranchisement, did not withhold payment of their wives' poll taxes, and saw it as a way in which black women could assist the black community generally.

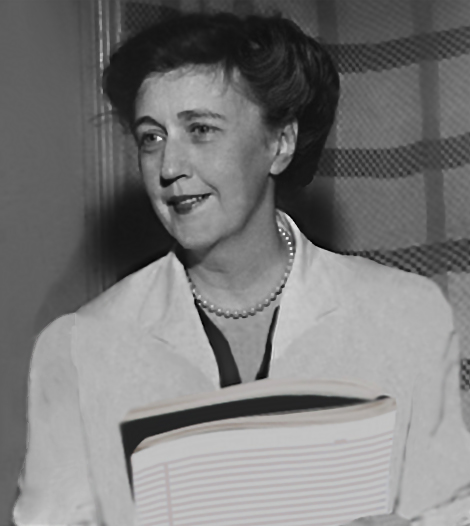
Virginia Foster Durr, 1948

Virginia Foster Durr was one of the many activists who came into the movement from other women's interest groups. Durr first became aware of the poll tax issue after going to work at the Women's Division of the Democratic National Committee in Alabama in the 1930s. When she joined the committee, its focus was on the elimination of poll taxes to enable white women to vote. Durr moved to Virginia and became vice-chair of the poll tax committee of the Southern Conference for Human Welfare, established in 1938, and its chair by 1939. In 1941, she co-founded the National Committee to Abolish the Poll Tax with Joseph Gelders and served as its vice-chair. Her husband, Clifford Durr, was an attorney with the Reconstruction Finance Corporation; he later served as a commissioner on the Federal Communications Commission, and counsel for Rosa Parks. Her brother-in-law was Associate Supreme Court Justice Hugo Black. Despite these connections, when she attempted to register to vote during the war, Durr faced issues typical of those encountered by prospective voters who were unfamiliar with courthouse processes. She had to locate the registrar, who lived in a rural area; wait for officials to find the books and a pen to record her registration; pay the taxes for two previous years and for the current year, as required by Virginia law; and obtain a receipt. When she subsequently went to vote, her name was not on the rolls, as she had not paid the interest due on the two years of back taxes. Durr's viewpoint changed over the course of working in the movement: she came to believe that "discrimination against Negroes and women was all part of the exploitation of human beings by other human beings." Other women who worked with Durr included Eleanor Bontecou, dean of Bryn Mawr College, who compiled statistical information; Frances Wheeler Sayler, a labor organizer and civil rights activist from Montana; and Sylvia Beitscher, Sarah d'Avila, and Katherine Shryver, who each served terms as executive secretary of the National Committee to Abolish the Poll Tax.

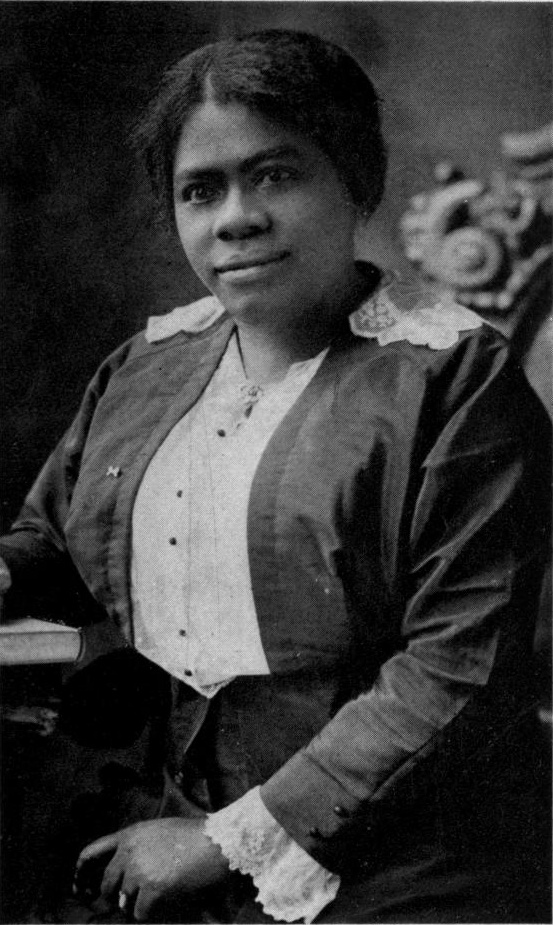
Mary McLeod Bethune, founder of the National Council of Negro Women c. 1919

Mary McLeod Bethune and Mary Church Terrell worked on committees of the Southern Conference for Human Welfare and later the National Committee to Abolish the Poll Tax, promoting anti-poll tax legislation among members of the National Association of Colored Women and the National Council of Negro Women. Black women who were members of the NAACP also worked to abolish poll taxes and in support of other civil rights legislation. They regularly sponsored drives, sometimes in conjunction with the Negro Women's League of Voters or the Federation of Negro Women's Clubs, to encourage black women to pay their poll taxes, register, and vote.

The National Woman's Party refused to take up the issue of poll taxes, but many other organizations joined the movement. Among the most active were state branches of the American Association of University Women, the Business and Professional Women's Foundation, and the League of Women Voters. The national organizations of these bodies lent only cautious support, trying to maintain the cohesion of their organizations by avoiding polarizing issues. Other national organizations which took an active role included the General Federation of Women's Clubs, the League of Women Shoppers, the National Association of Colored Women, the National Council of Catholic Women, the National Council of Home Demonstration Clubs, the National Council of Jewish Women, the National Council of Negro Women, The National Federation of Temple Sisterhoods, the American Federation of Labor, the Women's Division of the Democratic National Committee, the Women's International League for Peace and Freedom, the Women's Society of Christian Service, and the YWCA.

=== Tactics and outcomes ===
Tactics used by groups opposing the tax included applying pressure to state legislators, introducing federal legislation to abolish the taxes, attempting to sway public opinion, and bringing legal cases to the courts. The Women's Division of the Democratic National Committee, led by Mary Dewson and Eleanor Roosevelt, was concerned about the impact of the Depression and its consequences on women's ability to pay to vote. In the 1940s, the National Committee to Abolish the Poll Tax was the primary organization working on national legislation, until its demise in 1948 when many of its members and supporters were investigated during the Red Scare fueled by McCarthyism. As was typical for the time, the organization was led and run by women who worked under male figureheads. When by the late 1940s federal legislative action had repeatedly failed, focus changed on the issue. Thereafter, nationally, the push was to pass a federal constitutional amendment banning poll taxes as a prerequisite for voting in federal elections, which was successful in 1964 with the ratification of the Twenty-fourth Amendment to the United States Constitution.

Pressure on individual state legislatures continued through the 1960s. While individuals and groups attempted to sway legislators, many women turned to the courts after Breedlove. Though some had success with their suits and were awarded damages, poll tax as a prerequisite for voting had effectively prevented them from participating, as by the time their cases were heard, the elections were over. None of the suits resulted in overturning state law until the civil rights movement pushed for the passage of reforms, including the Voting Rights Act of 1965. Under the authority of this act, the Department of Justice was able to institute federal lawsuits against the states that still had local statutes that were excessively discriminatory in disenfranchising voters, by challenging their constitutionality. The matter was finally resolved, after a four-decades long struggle, by the U.S. Supreme Court in the decision handed down in Harper v. Virginia State Board of Elections in 1966.

== National efforts ==
The Women's Division of the Democratic National Committee began to study the impact of paying to vote in the early 1920s, and demonstrated that poll taxes were a barrier to women being able to participate in the electoral process. The national organization worked to organize Democratic women at state level to fight for repeal, with the aim of increasing their political power and ultimately achieving an equal representation of women on all party committees. When President Franklin D. Roosevelt announced in 1938 that the tax should be abolished, the Women's Division redoubled their efforts. At that time, the states which still had poll tax as a prerequisite to vote were Alabama, Arkansas, Georgia, Mississippi, South Carolina, Tennessee, Texas, and Virginia. Nationally, 70 percent of voters from non-poll tax states voted in presidential-election years, but 25 percent or less participated from states with the tax. In their initial campaigns the Women's Division pursued a state by state policy, as had earlier suffrage campaigns, to avoid the appearance of upsetting white supremacy. The actions of the Women's Division were independent from those of the party and had even been "forbidden" by Democratic National Committee chair James Farley.

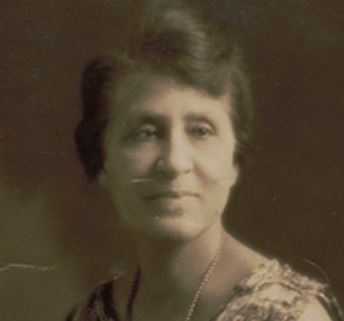
Mary Church Terrell, 1926

Women's luncheons sponsored by the Women's Division in Alabama and Georgia served as an incubator for the Southern Conference for Human Welfare, whose purpose was to unite black and white southern liberals in supporting a more equal democratic and economic system throughout the southern United States. The organization united New Deal policy-making liberals for the first time with labor union advocates in order to develop strategies for rebuilding society. Founded in 1938, the inaugural meeting included Eleanor Roosevelt, Durr, and Judge Louise O. Charlton. Aline Davis Hays, founder of the League of Women Shoppers, was active in the movement to abolish poll taxes, urging her women followers to support changes for women workers. She was targeted by the Dies Committee in 1939, which alleged she was involved in communist activity, as were Susan B. Anthony II, Virginia Durr, and Mary Church Terrell.

By 1939, Franklin Roosevelt had distanced himself from the anti-poll tax movement, but the Women's Division continued collecting statistics on how the tax impacted women's voting rights. A survey in 1940 found that there were well-established women's organizations fighting for repeal in Alabama, Arkansas and Tennessee. Another report, published by Bontecou in 1942, found that the majority of women who were able to vote in the South were widowed or single, implying the disenfranchisement of married women. The reports were distributed by the American Association of University Women to gain support for the abolition of the poll tax. Congressional hearings in 1948 heard evidence that in 1940, in the eight states requiring payment of a poll tax in order to register to vote, the total number of citizens eligible to register was 13.6 million, but only 3 million or 22 percent paid the poll tax. In 1942 (a non-presidential election year) only 828,000, 8 percent, actually voted. In 1946 it was 9 percent in the seven remaining poll tax states, compared with 13 percent in the four southern states which had repealed the poll tax and 47 percent in the non-poll tax states.

In 1942, national legislation was proposed to abolish poll taxes and the women's reports were used in hearings. The bill, introduced by Florida Senator Claude Pepper, failed. Durr, Anthony II, and Lucy Randolph Mason participated in the hearings. Reports from Alabama women's groups were presented at the hearings by the National Women's Trade Union League to verify that low income and a consequent inability to pay the poll tax was in large part responsible for disenfranchising women. While five bills passed the house between 1942 and 1949 which would have banned paying to vote in federal elections, none of them managed to pass the Senate. The 1949 effort to abolish the tax was a key part of the civil rights platform of President Harry S. Truman and was supported and campaigned for by Congresswoman Mary Teresa Norton, chair of the Committee on House Administration. Pressure to "sell democracy to the Third World was seriously hampered by continuing racial injustice at home", causing changes in both foreign policy initiatives and civil rights initiatives undertaken by the government.

== State efforts ==
States which required payment of poll taxes as a prerequisite to voting when the Nineteenth Amendment passed in 1920 were Alabama, Arkansas, Florida, Georgia, Louisiana, Mississippi, North Carolina, South Carolina, Tennessee, Texas, and Virginia. Most, but not all, of these states saw efforts by women and their organizations to repeal these taxes over the following decades.

=== Florida ===
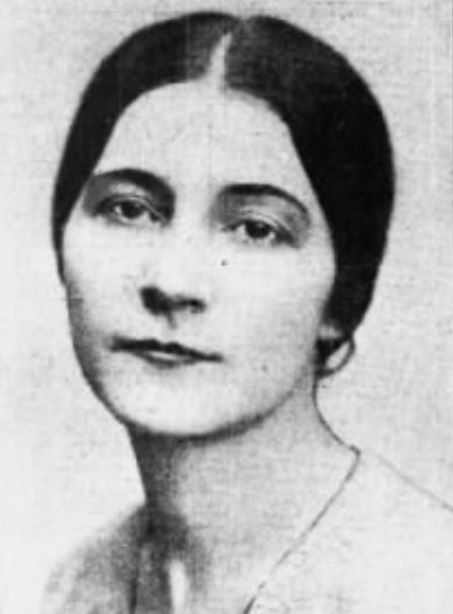
Josephine Wilkins, president of the Georgia chapter of the League of Women Voters, 1934

The League of Women Voters and the League of Democratic Women rallied women in Florida to oppose poll taxes. Women active in Florida included May J. Bradford and Florence H. Johnston. In the mid-1930s they called on the state legislature to abolish the requirement to pay to vote, achieving success in 1937.

=== Georgia ===
Members of the Georgia chapter of the League of Women Voters, led by Josephine Wilkins, worked from 1924 to combat a dual registration system in Atlanta which required voters to register at both the city hall and the courthouse. To tackle the problem, they gained support from the city clerk to create a mobile registration system and persuaded the National NuGrape Company to lend them a truck. When the driver they had hired refused to drive them, activists drove the truck themselves to designated registration locations. In a single week, League members registered 1,500 voters and for the next decade used the mobile registration truck to further increase voter participation. The League was instrumental in the 1945 repeal of the poll tax in Georgia, having begun a campaign in 1938.

=== Tennessee ===
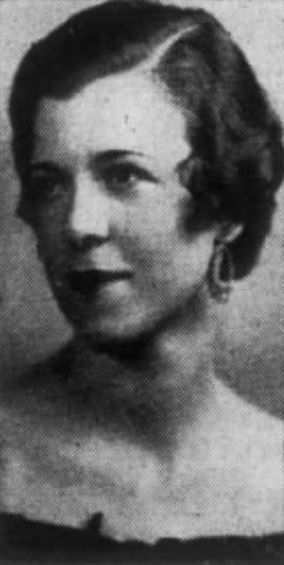
Dorothy Stafford, when elected president of the East Tennessee League of Women Voters in 1937

From the early 1930s, the Tennessee chapter of the League of Women Voters campaigned to abolish poll taxes. In 1939, the state League, led by women like Hazel Schaeffer and Violet Bray Lindsey, prepared a bill to repeal the tax and pushed for the state legislature to pass it. Three bills were introduced to the House that year, but each was referred to a legislative committee which took no action, and so all three failed. Two motions to work on a constitutional amendment were also proposed; one was tabled and the other failed for lack of a second. Two bills were also introduced that year in the Senate but never emerged from committee. Undeterred, the women, supported by the Davidson County Democratic Women, Tennessee Federation of Labor, and the state chapter of the Congress of Industrial Organizations, pressed for the measure again in 1941, but it was defeated in the Senate. State League of Women Voter members joined with the Industrial Council, the Tennessee Farm Bureau, the Tennessee State Grange, the YWCA, and 30 other civic and professional groups to found the Committee for Majority Rule. The goal of the group was to continue to press for the repeal of the poll tax; its officers were Jennings Perry, chair; Dorothy Stafford, eastern vice chair; Alton Lawrence, middle Tennessee vice chair; and Katharine Fulling, western vice chair.

In 1943, the state League lobbied the Tennessee General Assembly to immediately take up a bill to repeal poll taxes. The Assembly passed legislation, but a suit was filed by the Polk County sheriff alleging that the repeal violated the state constitution. The Tennessee Supreme Court voided the newly passed law as unconstitutional, since the Tennessee Constitution provided that "all male citizens shall be liable to a poll tax." Based upon that decision, the state League of Women Voters began to press for a reform of the state constitution. In 1949, women activists pressed the legislature to pass a bill exempting women and veterans of both World Wars from paying poll taxes, and secured the promise that a constitutional convention would be placed on the November ballot. In 1953 a constitutional amendment was passed abolishing the poll tax as a prerequisite to voting, and changing the state constitution to formally allow women to vote.

=== Arkansas ===
In Arkansas, clubwomen were active in the fight against the poll tax, but little headway was made after a repeal attempt in 1937 failed. Many Black and low-income Arkansans were disenfranchised because they couldn't afford to pay the poll tax. This highlights the socioeconomic barrier that pertains to voting. In 1958, former governor Sid McMath was joined by state members of the League of Women Voters and labor unionists in petitioning for a constitutional amendment to eliminate the poll tax, which again failed. In 1964, the Voter Registration Committee was formed, headed by physician and civil rights advocate H. D. "Dave" Luck. The coalition included women from the state chapters of the American Association of University Women, the Business and Professional Women's Association, the League of Women Voters, and the Arkansas Education Association, as well as civil rights leaders. They were successful in pressing for an amendment to the state constitution, which repealed poll taxes as a prerequisite to vote and implemented a new registration system, in 1964. After Arkansas removed the tax, only Alabama, Mississippi, Texas, and Virginia retained the poll tax as a prerequisite for voting.

=== Texas ===
In Texas, women achieved the right to vote in state primary elections and nominating conventions in 1918, and they soon began filing test cases. For example, Alma Koy filed suit in Texas in 1919 alleging that she had been refused the right to register to vote because the Austin County tax collector, William Schneider, would not allow her to pay her poll tax. The district court ruled against her because the women's suffrage act was in violation of the state constitution. She appealed the case to the First Supreme Judicial District of Texas, which upheld the district court decision but asked the Supreme Court of Texas to rule on the constitutionality of women's suffrage. The state Supreme Court upheld the right of women to vote on January 28, 1920.

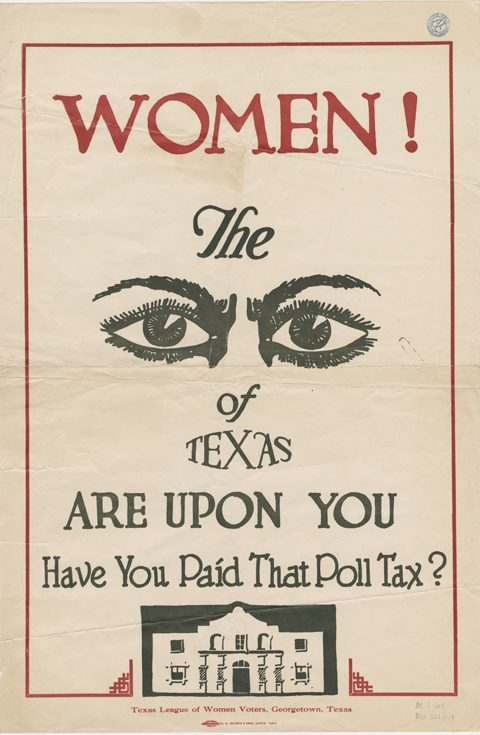
Texas League of Women Voters' poster, c. 1918

State legislation required payment of a poll tax in order to participate in elections, and specified that a woman had to apply to vote at least fifteen days prior to an election and "with her own hand" complete the proper registration. This was a literacy test not required of men; according to an article in the Austin American, its purpose was to prevent black, immigrant, Mexican Americans, and rural women from voting. In some areas, suffragists worked across ethnic lines to help women register to vote. Louise Dietrich in El Paso, who would serve as the state president of the League of Women Voters between 1938 and 1940, worked to organize registrations of black and Latina women who did not fall under the restrictions of the Thomason Law (H.B. No. 104), which targeted illiterate and non-English-speaking voters by preventing voter assistance such as translation.

The situation in Texas was complicated by the xenophobia faced by the potentially large Latino electorate. The federal Expatriation Act of 1907, which automatically changed a woman's citizenship upon marriage to that of her spouse, compounded the problem of racial identity. American-born women who married foreigners became citizens of their husband's country and lost their entitlement to vote. Men could vote if they filed an affidavit that they had an intention of acquiring U.S. citizenship, but unless their husbands were citizens, women could not vote despite their husband's intent to become one. Women in these cases were required to provide a copy of their marriage license and their husband's naturalization papers, since they had no individual nationality. After World War I, legislation such as the Thomason Law and the alien suffrage law of 1918, which restricted voting to citizens, curtailed the participation of women, as well as black and immigrant groups, because prospective voters who had been citizens for at least twenty-one years, were over age sixty-five, or were disabled could receive assistance even if they were illiterate. The federal Immigration Acts of 1921 and 1924 were passed to stem concerns that white authority was dwindling, and in effect extended segregation from blacks to other non-Anglo populations, creating separate public facilities for other non-white groups. Before World War I Latina women were considered to be white, but after these laws were passed Hispanic voters were excluded from white primaries. Activists registering voters argued that they would have to redouble their efforts in areas that were predominantly Anglo in order to prevent voter registration in areas with large Mexican-American populations from overwhelming the Anglo vote. Poll taxes disenfranchised Mexican Americans because their low wages made payment of the tax a hardship.

Lulu B. White, president of the Houston chapter of the NAACP in the 1930s and state director of the organization in the 1940s, worked for anti-poll tax initiatives and held rallies against poll taxes, as part of her civil rights platform. During World War II, the issue of poll taxes took a backseat to the war effort, although activists like Eugenie Terry, the local representative for the American Association of University Women, worked to keep momentum for repeal alive. The state chapter of the League of Women's Voters, along with other women's organizations, supported electoral amendments proposed in 1949 which allowed voters to cast ballots anonymously and would have eliminated the poll tax as a prerequisite to voting. The measure failed, but efforts began again in 1963 and once again the League of Women Voters campaigned for the elimination of the system of paying to vote. The attempt was unsuccessful, and the poll tax system remained in effect until February 9, 1966, when a federal three-judge panel declared that it violated the Due Process Clause of the United States Constitution. Though the state law requiring payment of poll taxes in order to vote was rendered void by the decision, and the legislature passed a resolution that year to abolish it, the amendment was not formally approved until 2009, when it was reintroduced by Congresswoman Alma Allen.

=== Alabama ===
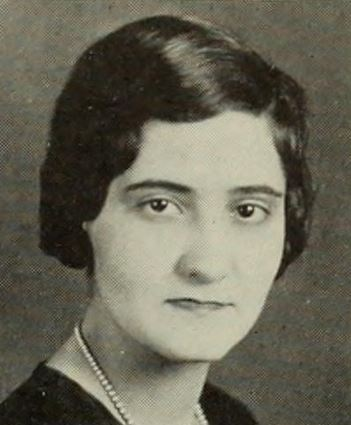
Nina Miglionico, 1932

The movement against poll taxes in Alabama was well established by 1930; it was led by university educated, economically independent women from the state chapters of the American Association of University Women and Federation of Business and Professional Women's Clubs. Women like Hallie Farmer, chair of the Legislative Committee for the Alabama chapter of the Business and Professional Women's Foundation, also fought to amend laws which did not offer equal employment rights to women and disqualified them from serving as jurors. Farmer became president of Alabama Joint Legislative Council when it formed in 1936. This council was composed solely of delegates from seven women's groups which joined forces to work towards the abolition of poll tax legislation; it included the Alabama Congress of Parents and Teachers, the state American Association of University Women, and state Federation of Business and Professional Women's Clubs, among others. Nina Miglionico, a lawyer and legal advisor to the group, brought in other professional women such as Dorah Sterne, an activist working on prison reform, and Delphine Feminear Thomas, director of the state Women's Division. Mildred Ellis Martin, former president of the Austin, Texas branch of the American Association of University Women, was also involved in the movement; as was Mary Lee Emerson, legislative chair of the Alabama chapter of the American Association of University Women.

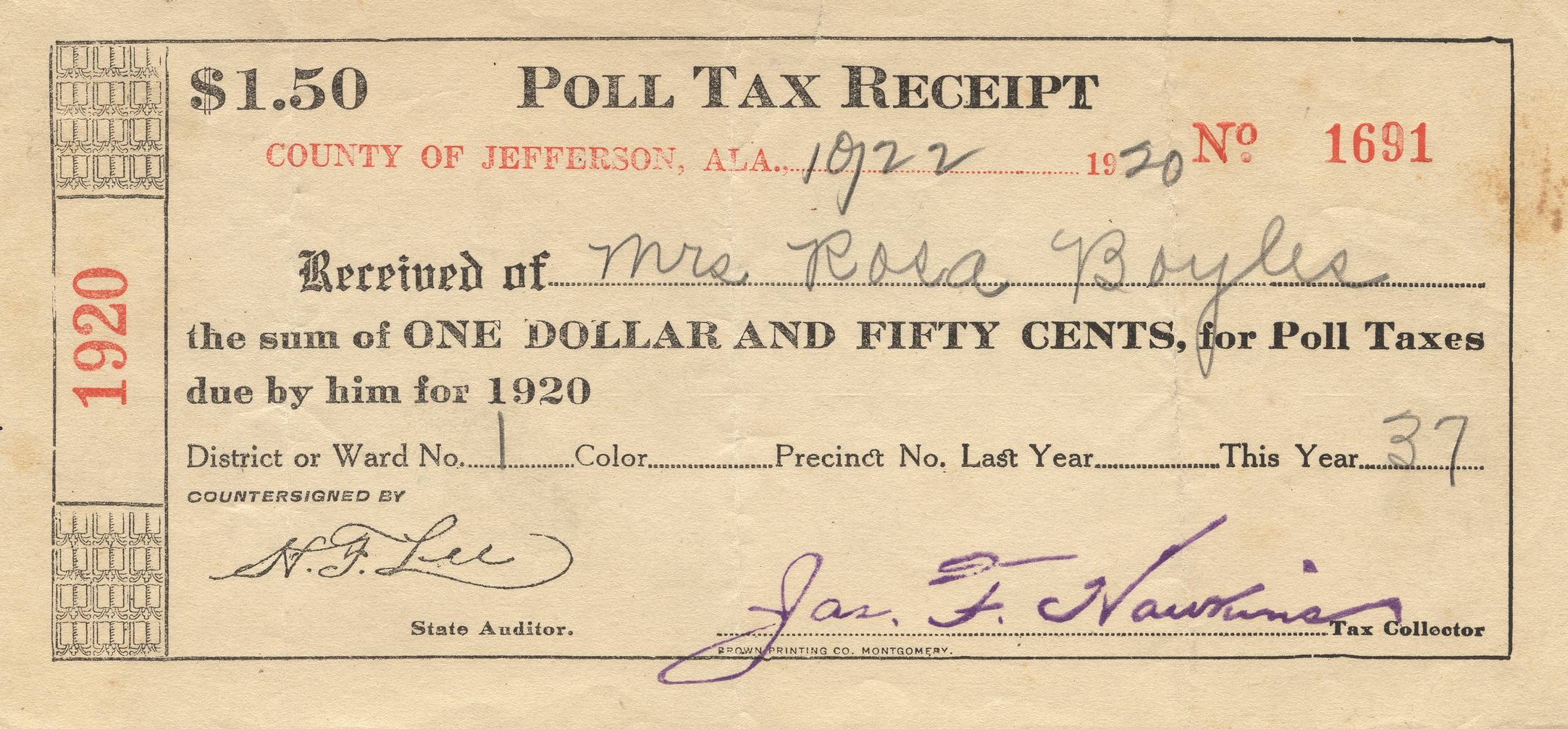
Poll Tax receipt for Rosa Boyles of Jefferson County, Alabama, October 22, 1920

In 1936, the faculty of Alabama College, the state college for women, launched a project to research the impact of paying to vote on women. The study, authored by Minnie Steckel, found that the lack of electoral participation was primarily because of the poll tax requirement rather than disinterest. By the late 1930s, individual white women working on abolishing poll taxes in Alabama, but not the organizations to which they belonged, recognized the benefit of black and white activists joining forces to increase their political agency. Other women's groups participating in the early 1940s included the Alabama chapter of the Federations of Women's Clubs, the Alabama Congress of Parents and Teachers, the Alabama Council of Home Demonstration Clubs, the Alabama Home Economics Association, the Montgomery Council of Jewish Women, and the Society of Christian Service for the Alabama Methodist Church. In 1944, the Alabama legislature passed a law exempting World War II veterans and active service personnel from poll taxes. Given the large number of men exempted, women activists argued that the exemption placed the burden of paying the poll tax on women. In 1946, Miglionico worked with branches of the American Association of University Women to compile state and local statistics on Jim Crow laws and their impact. She also surveyed women who were non-voters. Her research found "blatant race-based inequalities" and an inability to pay poll taxes as the reason many women failed to participate. Her reports began a process of examining commonalities in sexism and racism by the American Association of University Women. Mary Fair Burks founded the Women's Political Council, which would later spearhead the bus boycott, in Montgomery in 1946; it sought to improve the status of black people and to fight for their civil rights, including the right to vote.

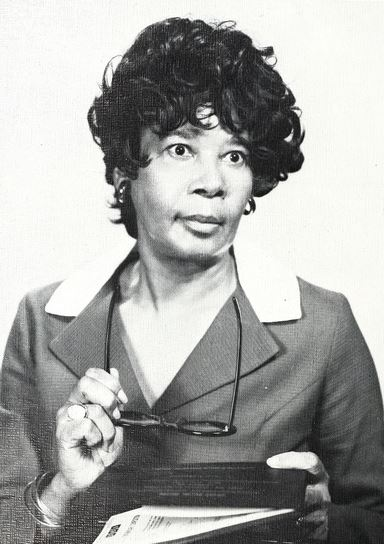
Mary Fair Burks, 1976

In 1947, a bill to eliminate poll taxes was defeated in the Alabama Legislature. Women activists not only continued to push for repeal, they began organizing fund raisers, such as bake sales, to raise money to assist their members in paying the taxes. The Alabama Joint Legislative Council had grown to incorporate an additional 16 women's groups, including representatives from the Alabama Women Lawyers' Association, the American Federation of Labor, the Congress of Industrial Organizations, and the National Farmers Union. The state chapter of the League of Women Voters, which had been inactive since the Great Depression, reorganized in the early 1950s with the aim of eliminating the poll tax requirement. In 1953, the state legislature passed a bill shortening the cumulative collection period from twenty-four to two years. Women's groups saw this as a victory but continued their efforts to help women pay the tax. The political climate, with the election of successive pro-segregationist governors, did not allow reintroduction of anti-poll tax legislation. Alabama's law remained in place until it was partially nullified by the Twenty-fourth Amendment, which barred a poll tax in federal elections, in 1964. A three-judge federal panel ruled that the Alabama statute requiring a poll tax as a prerequisite to voting was a violation of the Fifteenth Amendment to the U.S. Constitution on March 3, 1966.

=== Virginia ===
In Virginia, the anti-poll tax movement began in the 1920s. Among the organizations active in the movement were the Virginia chapter of the Federations of Women's Clubs, the Parents and Wives of Fighting Americans, the Virginia Electoral Reform League, the Virginia Reform League, and the Virginia Teacher's Association. As early as 1932, the state League of Women Voters warned that inability to pay the tax, because of high unemployment, would have an impact on elections. From the late 1930s, feminist members of the Women's Division of the Democratic National Committee began to fight to repeal the tax. Attempts were made in 1941 and 1945 by the state legislature to revise the pay to vote method, but the 1941 effort was a failure and the 1945 bid resulted in a committee study, which delayed any action until 1949. That year, the Campbell Amendments, based upon the committee study, were put on the November ballot. The amendments were vaguely worded and referred only to what sections of the constitution were to be changed without providing a method to eliminate the poll tax or a new registration procedure. This resulted in the League of Women Voters, the NAACP, the YWCA, and other groups which had been pressing for repeal, opposing their adoption. The amendments were defeated 206,542 to 56,687.

The legislative session of 1950 began with a push from Beatrice Foster, president of the state chapter of the League of Women Voters, continuing the repeal efforts. A bill passed the state House, but died in a Senate committee. The following year, the League conducted a public survey and, based upon its results, began a campaign, led by Carolyn Planck of Arlington, to eliminate the poll tax. Planck and delegates from the Councils of both Catholic and Jewish Women, the Federation of Women's Clubs, and the Junior Chamber of Commerce, met with the legislature in 1952, speaking in support of a poll tax repeal bill. As in 1950, the bill passed the House but never made it out of committee in the Senate. Hearings were held in 1954, by joint committees of the Virginia General Assembly, to determine whether poll tax as a prerequisite to voting should be abolished. Among those who spoke on behalf of repealing poll taxes were Adele Clark from the Virginia Council of Catholic Women; Naomi Cohn, representing the YWCA; Florence Lewis, a Miami, Florida activist and board member of the National Council of Jewish Women; Lois Van Valkenburgh, director of the League of Women Voters' poll tax committee, and other leaders from the Virginia Teacher's Association and the Virginia Voters League. Neither legislative body was willing to put forward a resolution in 1954 or 1956, in part because their focus was on the prevention of school desegregation.

Women from Virginia continued to press for abolition of the poll tax on both the federal and state level into the 1960s. Bills were introduced again in 1962 in both houses of the legislature, but did not advance. The following year, Ethel R. McDonald, president of the state League of Women Voters, led a campaign bringing together activists from church, civic, labor and political organizations throughout the state to fight for the abolition of the poll tax. Members of the Virginia chapter of the American Association of University Women were also involved in repeal efforts. Those who testified at the legislative session in 1963 included McDonald; Lavinia J. Banks for the Virginia Teachers' Association; Hazel K. Barger, representing the Republican National Committee; Elaine Julia Kobylanski Byrd of Waynesboro, state legislative chair of the American Association of University Women; Dorothy Hirst of the Women's Democratic Club; and Thelma Ohmsen, representing the Richmond Diocesan Council of Catholic Women. Court cases brought by African-American women and men finally ended the practice of using the poll tax to limit voting in Virginia. Their briefs showed that poverty, as well as race, impacted women as a class. On March 25, 1966, the U.S. Supreme Court ruled that the state statute requiring poll taxes as a prerequisite for voting violated the Fourteenth Amendment of the U.S. Constitution's Equal Protection Clause and was therefore void.

=== Mississippi ===
There was little participation in the movement by women in Mississippi. There were many factors which effected the low participation rate, including higher levels of deadly violence by the Ku Klux Klan than in any other Southern state, the highest population of blacks in the country, and the lowest median income, education levels, and black voting registrations in the nation. It also charged the highest rate of poll taxes in the nation. There was no action by the state legislature towards repeal, and so no state-wide referendum occurred, although individual women filed legal cases challenging the poll tax statutes. On April 8, 1966, a three-judge federal panel determined Mississippi's poll tax as a requirement to vote was void.

== Cases brought by women ==
A large proportion of cases filed to challenge poll tax statutes were brought by women. Lawsuits on poll tax were filed on a variety of issues including ineligibility because of age or residence, on the basis that it violated the Fourteenth Amendment's Equal Protection and Due Process Clauses, because it violated the Twenty-fourth Amendment, and because it violated a Supreme Court ruling.

One of the earliest cases dealt with the age of the voter and whether tax could be collected from someone who attained their majority, and so eligibility to vote, in an election year. Dorothy Bentley Jones was a member of the Parents and Wives of Fighting Americans organization and the Virginia Electoral Reform League. She first filed suit on the issue of poll taxes in 1944 in the federal courts. Jones, who had turned 21 in May 1944, was attempting to register for the first time. Hazeltine Settle, the registrar for Roanoke, attempted to collect taxes for 1945 from Jones as a prerequisite for registering to vote. Virginia law at the time required payment for the two previous years and for the current year, with interest and penalties if the previous years tax had not already been paid, in order to be eligible to vote. Jones refused payment, contending she had not been eligible to vote prior to 1944 and the first year for which she could be assessed the tax was 1945, which was not yet due. Jones, an African-American woman and the wife of an army corporal, was represented by New York lawyer Arthur Dunn and Roanoke attorney Moss Plunkett. Her case was successful in confirming that Virginia voters who attained voting age in an election year, prior to the election, were not subject to paying poll tax, but had to register a minimum of 30 days prior to the election to be eligible to participate that year. In 1947, Jones initiated a second suit when she was denied the right to vote for failure to pay poll taxes for 1945 and 1946. She contended per the answer of the Attorney General of Virginia, Abram Staples, in her previous case, that payment of poll tax was not a qualification of determining voter fitness, and that if payment of poll tax was purely a prerequisite to voting then it was an unconstitutional burden. Her argument was that the Constitution of Virginia, in requiring poll taxes be paid in order to vote, deprived Virginia voters of the rights and privileges of United States citizens under the federal constitution. Failing to receive a timely response from the defendants, Jones asked for a summary judgment in her favor. The district court ruled against her. The promise by federal congressional leaders of passage of a pending anti-poll tax bill led her to abandon a planned appeal.

Eileen S. Evans filed suit in Virginia, in 1944, over poll tax irregularities. She and her husband, a private in the U.S. Army, relocated to the state in July 1943 from West Virginia. The following January, Evans went to the courthouse to request information about voting. She was informed that as she was not a resident of the state on January 1, 1943, no taxes were due from her to register for 1944, but that she had to register before October 7. Friends advised her to seek a second opinion and she returned to the courthouse to inquire again. She was advised that an amendment to the law did require her to pay a poll tax for 1943. She paid the assessment in September 1944 and registered to vote. In November, Evans was not allowed to vote in the election as she had not paid the tax six months prior to the election. She then challenged the constitutionality of the poll tax. Attorney General Staples concurred with the allegations and Jones was awarded damages and a judgment was entered in her favor; this allowed the state to avoid a federal hearing on whether charging a poll tax was a valid voting qualification.

In December 1949, Jessie Butler, an African-American woman, was refused the right to register to vote in Virginia because of unpaid poll taxes. She filed suit against the registrar of Arlington, Mary A. Thompson, claiming that the requirement to pay poll tax was enacted to disenfranchise black voters and violated federal equal protection laws. The federal district court denied her request to convene a three-judge statutory court to evaluate the constitutional questions. Butler appealed to the Fourth Circuit Court of Appeals which ruled that a statutory court should be convened. The three-judge panel ruled that the tax was fair and equally administered, regardless of why it had been enacted. The U.S. Supreme Court affirmed the decision in 1951.

In 1964, Victoria Gray and Ceola Wallace, black women from Hattiesburg, Mississippi, challenged the state poll tax law on the grounds that it violated the recently passed Twenty-fourth Amendment by limiting their ability to vote. After ratification of the Twenty-fourth Amendment, which outlawed poll taxes as a qualification for voting in federal elections, the Mississippi Legislature had enacted a measure requiring voters to obtain a receipt for non-payment of the taxes. A three-judge federal panel declared the law unconstitutional, as it hampered registered voters from casting their ballots. The ruling did not abolish the poll tax in Mississippi for state elections.

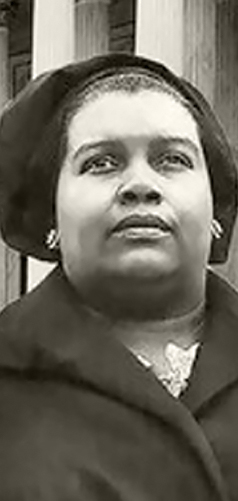
Evelyn Butts, 1966

Also, in 1964, Annie E. Harper, who was joined by Gladys Berry and Curtis and Myrtle Burr, brought suit against the Virginia Board of Elections arguing that the poll tax denied them equal protection because they were poor. Evelyn Thomas Butts filed a separate complaint, which was combined with the Harper litigants as a companion suit. Her fellow plaintiffs were variously reliant on social security, their children's or their husbands' earnings or disability benefit. All were on low incomes and each had child care responsibilities. As with prior cases, it was dismissed, appealed and then referred for adjudication by a three-judge panel in the Eastern District Court of Virginia. The judges ruled that poll taxes were constitutional, citing Breedlove. The cases were appealed to the Supreme Court, which ruled in Harper v. Virginia State Board of Elections (383 U.S. 663, 1966) that Virginia's poll tax violated the Fourteenth Amendment's Equal Protection and Due Process Clauses. Justice William O. Douglas wrote in the majority opinion, "Wealth, like race, creed, or color, is not germane to one's ability to participate intelligently in the electoral process." The ruling affirmed that the right to vote was fundamental and could not be conditional upon paying a tax. It was a landmark decision, eliminating the poll tax as a barrier to state and federal elections.

In 1966, Bessie Mae Huntley, Mary Helen Kohn, Joe Booker, and Robert Buchanan filed suit against the Holmes County, Mississippi Board of Supervisors. The plaintiffs, who were all black citizens, said the poll tax had prevented them from voting in a recent bond issue to improve the County Community Hospital. They asked the Federal District Court in Jackson to restrain the county from implementing the bond issue until an election including all eligible voters could be held. On April 2, 1966, the court refused to grant an injunction, but six days later the same court, with a different three-judge panel, ruled on a case brought by the Justice Department under the Voting Rights Act that the Mississippi poll tax was unconstitutional.

== Impact of repeal ==
In 1934, poll taxes were repealed in Louisiana, increasing the number of men who voted by 25 percent and the number of women voting by nearly 100 percent. (Note: Huey Long (former governor and United States Senator) and his political machine led the movement to repeal poll tax in Louisiana.) After Georgia repealed the tax voter turnout rose from 16.9 percent to 30.3 percent of eligible voters; immediately after the poll tax laws were repealed the vote in congressional elections more than doubled. In Florida turnout was 46 percent higher for the 1940 presidential election than in 1936 and in Tennessee turnout rose 12 percent after poll taxes were abolished. When Alabama eliminated payment of poll taxes in 1953 for citizens over 45, an additional 200,000 white women registered to vote the following year. Before the poll tax in Arkansas was abolished, 80 percent of the adult population in the state was prevented from voting by the prerequisite; when it was removed, registrations for the 1970 general election increased by 23.18 percent. After elimination of the poll tax in Texas, party primary participation in Houston by women, people under age 40, voters with Spanish surnames, and blue collar workers exceeded the portion of the electorate that had formerly paid poll taxes. Of particular note was the dramatic rise from 1.6 percent to 7.2 percent in Mexican-American registrations as a proportion of the total of registered voters. In Mississippi black registrations to vote rose from 6.9 percent of total registrations in 1964 to 59.8 percent in 1967.

In 1952, there was a 21 percent difference in the registration rates of men and women in the South, compared with a 5 percent difference in the rest of the United States, and the voter participation rate in the south among women was a quarter of women's participation elsewhere. By 1980, Southern women registered at almost the same rate as men and were more likely than men to cast ballots in elections. Overall, the U.S. voter turnout in the non-Southern states was in decline over the period from 1956 to 2000, whereas in the South voter turnout during the same period more than doubled. The removal of barriers such as poll taxes, grandfather clauses, (Note: Grandfather clauses guaranteed that men whose fathers or grandfathers had voted before the Civil War and before passage of the Fifteenth Amendment were eligible as voters. As most blacks' grandfathers had been slaves, they were ineligible to be voters under such clauses. Whites, however, were eligible, even if they could not pass property requirements or literacy tests used as prerequisites to voting registration. Grandfather clauses with regard to voting were overturned as unconstitutional by the Supreme Court decision in Guinn v. United States (238 U.S. 347) in 1915.) and literacy tests contributed to increased registration and voter turnout, especially for blacks, women, and poor whites in the South. Other factors included the increasing proportion of women working outside the home and increased political engagement by Southern women. In part, greater political involvement had to do with new organizations like the National Organization for Women and the National Women's Political Caucus. By the late 1960s and early 1970s, Southern states had similar turnout rates to the rest of the country.

Passage of the Twenty-fourth Amendment in 1964, which abolished poll taxes in federal elections, did not stop Southern states from continuing to use the poll tax to restrict voting in local and state elections. At the time of its passage, an estimated 4 million people of color and people on low-incomes were prevented from voting by poll taxes. In an effort to override state noncompliance, the Voting Rights Act of 1965 was passed. It "authorized the Department of Justice to enjoin states employing poll taxes as a precondition to voting". In other words, the Voting Rights Act gave federal oversight to election procedures, enabling the attorney general to challenge the use of disenfranchising provisions, such as poll taxes and literacy tests, on the grounds that they were discriminatory. Using that power, in 1966 the federal courts nullified the remaining state statutes in Alabama, Mississippi, and Texas which required the payment of poll taxes as a prerequisite for voting. In 1975, under pressure from the Chicano movement, the Voting Rights Act's protections were extended to cover linguistic minorities, including American Indians, Asian Americans, Native Alaskans, and Hispanic and Latino Americans.

== Historic significance ==
Contrary to pre-1970s popular and academic beliefs, American women's rights activists continued their activism during the interwar and post-war periods, as is demonstrated by their involvement in the movement to repeal poll taxes. Until the early 1970s, academics did not focus on women's history, their issues, or their political cultures. Scholars have characterized feminism as the struggle for socio-economic and political rights in the United States. They have suggested that first-wave feminism lasted from the 1850s to the 1920s, with the struggle not resuming until second-wave feminism began in the 1960s. Other women's historians identified the interwar and immediate post-war periods as a time of little feminist activity. In 1983, historians Joan M. Jensen and Lois Scharf asserted that feminist activists between 1920 and 1940 lived complex lives full of hidden barriers. Scholarship on the period confirms that women continued to strive to expand their rights, but were restricted by changes in the economic, political, and social structures and institutions, which made it difficult to organize and maintain the women's movement. Societal concerns over the Great Depression, World War II, and the Cold War pushed women's issues into the background. Women continued to function within organizational structures, but they were often doing so in a hostile environment. Their activities were perceived as threatening to the traditional way of life of Americans. Media outlets routinely refused to give feminist issues coverage and often recharacterized reform efforts as men's issues.

Women and people of color in the South were not apathetic in the fight for voting rights, although historians and political scientists before the 21st century often characterized Southern women as indifferent to political matters in the interwar and immediate post-war periods. Their efforts toward abolishing the federal poll tax became the first step in the significant changes to voting rights which would be enshrined in the Voting Rights Act of 1965. Sara Alpern and Dale Baum found in their study, Female Ballots: The Impact of the Nineteenth Amendment, published in 1985, that there was an overall decline in voting after the passage of the Nineteenth Amendment. They concluded by using a comparison of men and women's election participation statistics to demonstrate that women were not apathetic. Instead, measures such as literacy tests, responsible for 90 percent of the disenfranchisement of African Americans, and poll taxes – which disenfranchised women, the poor, and people of color – impacted the ability to vote. V. O. Key, a political scientist and historian of U.S. elections who was a recognized expert during the mid-century period, and other academics, minimized the role of women and African Americans in the poll tax reform movement. Works by other scholars such as the attorney and legal historian, Ronnie L. Podolefsky, and the history professor, Sarah Wilkerson Freeman, have re-analyzed the efforts to repeal poll taxes and concluded that women were a significant force. The movement to repeal poll tax laws is significant as it illustrates how the struggle for rights for blacks and white women converged by the 1950s.
