= Alabama Public Library Service =

Official library agency of Alabama

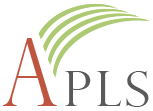

Agency overview
- Formed: March 1939
- Jurisdiction: State of Alabama
- Headquarters: 6030 Monticello Drive; Montgomery, AL 36117, United States; 32°21′53″N 86°12′07″W
- Agency executive: Nancy Pack, Director
- Website: aplsws1.apls.state.al.us/aplsnew/

The Alabama Public Library Service is the official state library agency of Alabama located in Montgomery, Alabama. They assist all established public libraries and advise communities that may want to establish public libraries. They also provide library services to state employees, and administer the Alabama Regional Library for the Blind and Physically Handicapped (BPH).

== History ==
Alabama's created legislation for a tax-supported State Law Library available to legislators on January 19, 1828. Alabama didn't create a separate agency for funding and administering public libraries until 1959 and did not create a tax-supported system serving every county until 1974. Much of the public library development in the state was done by the Alabama Federation of Women's Clubs (AFWC) and the Alabama Library Association. The Alabama Department of Archives was created in 1901 and expanded to include a Library Extension Division in 1907. That group helped manage library development in the state and was also charged with acquiring statistics about libraries in Alabama. In 1931 the Alabama Federation of Women's Clubs and the Alabama Library Association promoted legislation that would create and fund a state library agency but it was vetoed by Governor Benjamin Miller. In March 1939, the Public Library Service Division (PLSD) was created within the Alabama Department of Archives with a small budget and its own executive board separate from ADH, with Lois Ranier Green as its first director. When the Works Progress Administration Library Program was created in 1935, it funded 523 workers in Alabama and doubled the PLSD's funding. By 1974, all Alabama counties had access free tax-supported public libraries.

== See also ==
- List of libraries in the United States
