= Alabama Federation of Women's Clubs =

Alabama Federation of Women's Clubs (AFWC; also known as GFWC Alabama) is a state organization composed of women's clubs in Alabama. Established in Birmingham in 1895, and admitted to the General Federation of Women's Clubs (GFWC) on December 26, 1907. Foster House became the official headquarters in 1983.

== Establishment ==
In February, 1895, the president, vice president and secretary of the Cadmean Club, a literary club, invited the women's literary clubs of Alabama to send representatives to a convention to be held in Birmingham for the purpose of forming a State Federation. On April 17, representatives from various clubs in the State, all purely literary, convened in Birmingham, in order to form a State Federation. Selma, Tuscaloosa, Montgomery, and New Decatur sent representatives. The convention met in the parlors of the South Highland Presbyterian Church. Mrs. George C. Ball, president of the Cadmean Circle, welcomed the guests. Mary La Fayette Robbins replied on behalf of the clubs. Mrs. Sterling A. Wood, of Montgomery, was elected president of the convention. A discussion of the purposes of the convention was had on the first day. Arguments for and against federation were advanced, Robbins reading a strong paper in favor of the movement. A number of subjects which were inimical to the success of a federation were brought forward, and discussed. The State Federation was fully organized, however, with Mary LaFayette Robbins, of Selma, as president; Mrs. George B. Eager, of Montgomery, vice president; Mrs. John D. Wyker, of Decatur, corresponding secretary; Mrs. George L. Haven, of Birmingham, recording secretary; and Mrs. Sterling A. Wood, of Montgomery, treasurer.

== History ==
The GFWC Alabama was organized April 17, 1895, in Birmingham. The charter clubs were the Cadmean Circle, Clionian Club and Highland Book Club of Birmingham; No Name Club of Montgomery; Progressive Culture Club, Decatur; and Study Club, Selma. Approximately 130 women comprised the total membership. In 1921, 26 years after the federation, there were 225 clubs with a membership of 10,000 in the organization.

Eligibility for GFWC membership required the club to show "that its purpose is not sectarian or political, but chiefly educational, literary, scientific or artistic."

With the growth of the organization, it was found imperative to divide the state into seven districts, in each of which an annual meeting was held in the spring by the clubs of that territory, presided over by a chair who is a vice-president of the Federation. Each District Secretary-Treasurer was an exofficio delegate to the state convention. The District assembly could not initiate or endorse any movement not already approved by the Federation as a whole, but could discuss such matters and make recommendations in regard to them to the annual convention.

== Objective ==
"To bring together for mutual help, for intellectual improvement and for social union the different women's literary clubs of the state," were the original objects of the organizations, but with the development and growth that followed a few years experience, the Constitution was changed to read: "To bring into communication the various women's clubs throughout the state, that they may compare methods of work, become mutually helpful and through Federation grow to be a power for good."

== Organ ==
The work of the organization was greatly facilitated by the use of an official organ, either a department in a current newspaper or its own magazine. Of the former media, the Free Lance, Birmingham, was used in 1895; the Birmingham Evening News, 1901–05; the Mobile Register, 1905–12; the Birmingham Evening News 1913–19, and The Montgomery Advertiser, 1919–21. During 1899–1900, the Federation owned and published its own organ, a magazine, Woman's Work, Montgomery. The Federation editors were, Mesdames Joseph McLester, L. J. Haley, Erwin Craighead, E. R. Morrisette, A. J. Ridale, J. Sydney Robbins, J. H. Phillips, H. P. Harshfield, W. H. Seymour, J. D. Elliott, Dora C. Fell, J. Walter Black.

== Libraries ==
The first philanthropic educational work of the Federation was undertaken in 1897, in behalf of the library of the Alabama Girl's Industrial School (later, the Alabama Girl's Technical Institute; now, University of Montevallo), Montevallo. A committee on Traveling Libraries was also raised that year, and during the ensuing eight years, a traveling library system was conducted by the committee, with a total of 4,000 books in circulation in rural schools and communities. In 1905, such of these books as had not been donated to school libraries, were given to the Alabama Library Association, and the work of circulating them delegated to that organization. Later, they were given to the Department of Archives and History and became, with extensive enlargements through the generosity of Dr. Thomas M. Owen, Director, greatly increased in numbers and constantly in circulation. The library committee of the Federation was then dissolved.

== Education ==
The committee on education made its first report on the status and needs of education in Alabama at the convention of 1898, and recommended that the Federation undertake to "create public sentiment for better standards and methods, especially in the public schools, and that it co-operate with other forces in the State for such educational laws and reforms as are necessary and desirable." At once the club women began to investigate not only the educational system of their own state, but for comparison, the systems of other states. It then advocated, agitated, co-operated with and urged legislation for public school kindergartens, educational qualifications for eligibility to the office of county superintendent of education, local taxation for the support of public schools, better school buildings and equipment, a minimum school term, compulsory school attendance, institutes for teachers, salaries by grades, monthly payment of salaries, examination of teachers by a State Board, education in patriotism by the observance of Alabama Day and Lee's Birthday in schools, women on school boards, industrial education and elementary industrial training in common schools, dormitory accommodations for women at the State University, stimulation of interest in library laws, and the elimination of illiteracy.

== Scholarship Committee ==
The scholarship committee of the Federation was created in 1898 for the purpose of establishing scholarships at the Alabama Girl's Industrial School, Montevallo. Other institutions soon drew the interest of the club women and by 1916, the organization having gradually increased its influence and resources, maintained seven scholarships, four of which were loan, viz., Alabama Girl's Technical Institute, two; University of Alabama, one; Southern Industrial Institute, Camp Hill, one; Downing Industrial Institute for Girls, Brewton, one; Judson College, one, music; Alabama Polytechnic Institute, one, open only to students from the Alabama Boy's Industrial School. Besides the foregoing, the Federation had the gift of 30 scholarships, varying from one to four in the several schools, viz., The Congressional District Agricultural Schools, Woman's College of Alabama, Judson College, Athens College, Presbyterian Synodical College, Howard College (now Samford University), Miss Woodberry's School, Atlanta, Georgia, and Southern University of Music, Atlanta.

== Notable people ==
- Lura Harris Craighead (1858–1926), president, AFWC
- Laura Montgomery Henderson (1867–1940), president, AFWC
- Dixie Bibb Graves (1882–1965), first lady of the State of Alabama; first woman to serve as a United States senator from Alabama
- Letitia Dowdell Ross (1866-1952), president, AFWC
- Minnie Steckel (1890–1952), teacher, psychologist, clubwoman, activist
