= Linda K. Kerber =

American feminist and historian (born 1940)

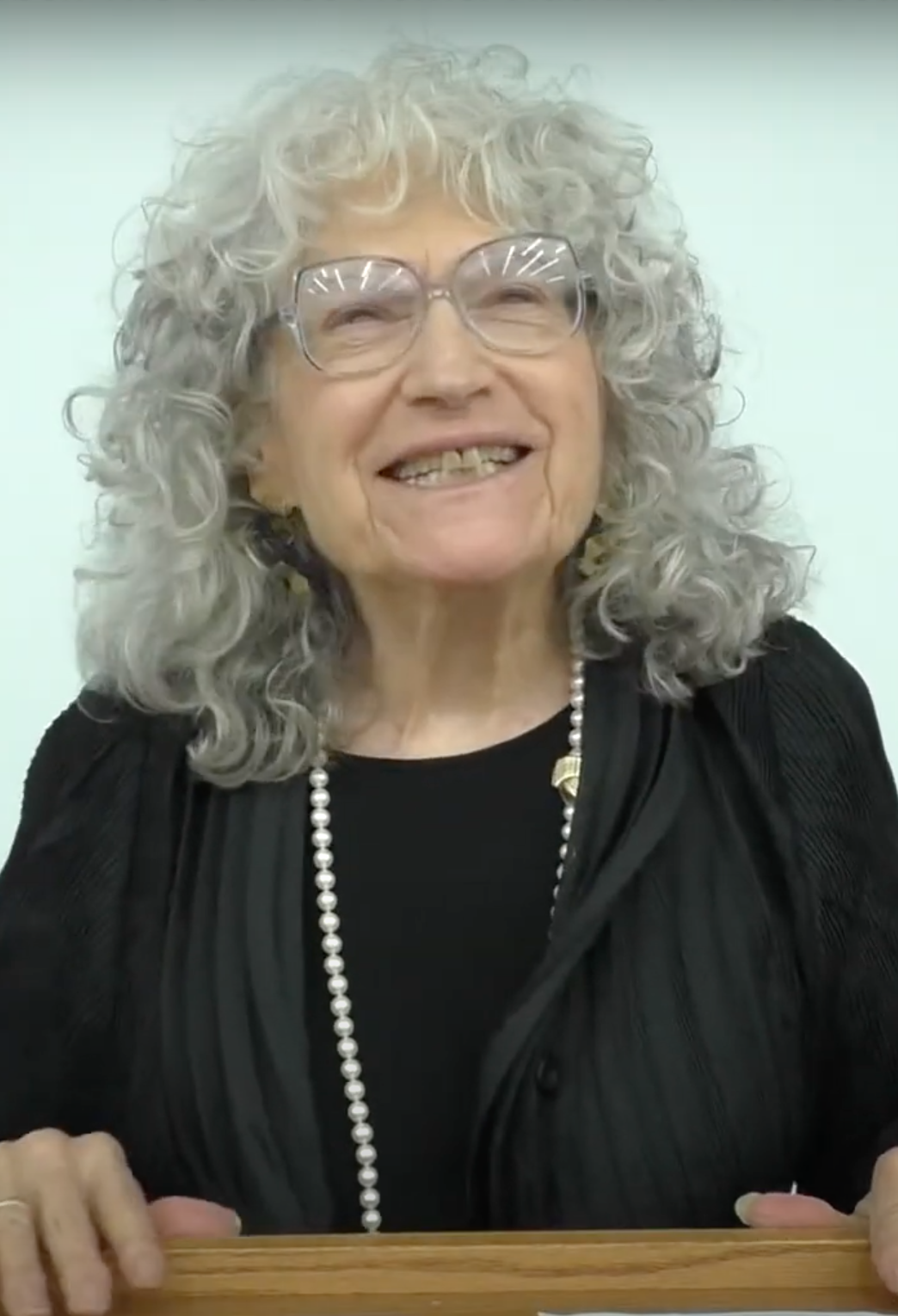
- Kerber in 2020
- Born: January 23, 1940 (age 86); Brooklyn, New York City, New York, US
- Other name: Linda Kaufman Kerber
- Spouse: Richard Kerber (m. 1960)

Academic background
- Education: Barnard College (BA); New York University (MA); Columbia University (PhD)
- Doctoral advisor: Richard Hofstadter

Academic work
- Discipline: History
- Sub-discipline: American history; intellectual history; women's history
- School or tradition: Feminism
- Institutions: University of Iowa

Linda Kaufman Kerber (born January 23, 1940, in Brooklyn, New York) is an American feminist, political and intellectual historian, and educator who specializes in the history and development of the democratic mind in the United States and the history of women in the U.S.

== Early life and education ==
The daughter of Harry Hagman and Dorothy Haber Kaufman, Kerber graduated from Forest Hills High School in Queens, New York, and married Richard Kerber in 1960. She received an AB from Barnard College (1960), an MA from New York University (1961), and a PhD from Columbia University (1968) under the supervision of Richard Hofstadter.

== Career ==
Kerber joined the faculty at the University of Iowa in 1971, and is the May Brodbeck Professor in Liberal Arts & Sciences, and also an emeritus lecturer in the College of Law and emeritus professor of history.

Kerber published her first book, Federalists in Dissent: Imagery and Ideology in Jeffersonian America, in 1970. One of the first historians to interpret the history of the early United States through the lens of women's history, she published Women of the Republic: Intellect and Ideology in Revolutionary America in 1980. In this book, Kerber discusses the concept of "Republican motherhood", which she had formerly introduced in a 1976 article.

In 1998, Kerber published No Constitutional Right to be Ladies: Women and the Obligations of Citizenship, a political history of women and the law that spans the history of the United States from the early republic to the late twentieth century. It received two prizes from the American Historical Association: the Littleton-Griswold Prize for the best book on U.S. legal history and the Joan Kelly Memorial Prize for the best book in women's history.

She has also published essays and books on feminism and history and on women's intellectual history.

From the beginning of her career, inspired by the feminist movement, Kerber played an active role in enhancing the status of women in the historical profession. An early member of the Berkshire Conference of Women Historians, she began to attend meetings of the newly formed Coordinating Committee for Women in the Historical Profession. In 1969, she played an instrumental role in founding the West Coast History Association, now known as the Western Association of Women Historians. In the early 1970s, when the American Historical Association appointed a Committee on Women Historians to provide recommendations as to how to improve the professional positions of women, she was among its first members and also served as its chair.

Kerber served as the president of the American Studies Association in 1988, the Organization of American Historians in 1996–97, and the American Historical Association in 2006. She was the Harold Vyvyan Harmsworth Visiting Professor of American History at Oxford University in 2006–2007, delivering the Harold Vyvyan Harmsworth Memorial Lecture at Oxford on November 16, 2006.

She has received fellowships from the National Endowment for the Humanities, the National Humanities Center, the John Simon Guggenheim Memorial Foundation, and the Radcliffe Institute for Advanced Study. She is a member and served on the council of the American Philosophical Society, is a fellow of the American Academy of Arts and Sciences, and is a Distinguished Fellow of the Rothermere American Institute. Kerber served on the international advisory board of the feminist academic journal Signs.

== Works ==
- Federalists in Dissent: Imagery and Ideology in Jeffersonian America (Cornell University Press, 1970; reprint, 1980)
- Women of the Republic: Intellect and Ideology in Revolutionary America (University of North Carolina Press for the Institute for Early American History and Culture, 1980)
- Women's America: Refocusing the Past (with Jane Sherron De Hart) (Oxford University Press, 1995; 6th ed., 2004; 8th ed., with Jane Sherron De Hart, Cornelia H. Dayton, and Judy Tzu-Chun Wu; 10th ed., with Jane Sherron De Hart, Cornelia H. Dayton, and Karissa Haugeberg, 2025)
- U.S. History as Women's History: New Feminist Essays (with Alice Kessler-Harris and Kathryn Kish Sklar) (University of Carolina Press, 1995)
- Toward an Intellectual History of Women: Essays by Linda K. Kerber (University of North Carolina Press, 1997)
- No Constitutional Right to be Ladies: Women and the Obligations of Citizenship (Hill and Wang, 1998)

Academic offices
Preceded by Kathryn Kish Sklar	Harmsworth Professor of American History; 2006	Succeeded by Lizabeth Cohen
Professional and academic associations
Preceded by Lois Banner	President of the American Studies Association; 1988–1989	Succeeded by Allen F. Davis
Preceded by Michael Kammen	President of the Organization of American Historians; 1996–1997	Succeeded by George M. Fredrickson
Preceded by James J. Sheehan	President of the American Historical Association; 2006	Succeeded by Barbara Weinstein
