= Ceola Wallace =

American seamstress and civil rights activist

- l-r: Johnny Waters, Ceola Wallace, Willie McGeey, and Jake Plum. Waters, Wallace and Plum are poll workers assisting McGeey in registering to vote, 1964
- Born: Ceola Sloan; July 22, 1907; Forrest County, Mississippi
- Died: March 20, 1994 (aged 86); Hattiesburg, Mississippi
- Other name: Ceola Boochie
- Occupations: seamstress, civil rights activist

Ceola Wallace (July 22, 1907 – March 20, 1994) was an American seamstress and civil rights activist from Mississippi. She was one of the African-American women who filed lawsuits in the women's poll tax repeal movement to eliminate the requirement to pay taxes before one could vote. She was active in the 1964 voter registration, Freedom Summer Project.

== Biography ==
Ceola Sloan was born on July 22, 1907, in Forrest County, Mississippi. She came from a large family which included four brothers — Jacob, Mose, Willie and Ison – and a sister, Louvenia. She was unable to finish more than the first grade of school, but taught herself to read and write. Her first husband was surnamed Boochie. They had eight children: Annie, Desseree, Eddie Lee, George, James Curtis, James H., Mary Lee, and Mose. Her husband died leaving Boochie a young widow and she went to work as a tenant farmer. She also took in laundry and did farm and domestic chores to earn support for the family.

Earning $3 per week from her various jobs, Boochie taught herself to sew by reading the instructions on the back of dressmaking patterns. She remarried a construction worker named John Wallace and lived Hattiesburg, where she gained a reputation as a seamstress. Wallace was very involved in the civil rights movement and her photograph was featured in Ebony in September 1964, regarding the Freedom Summer Project, which tried to help African Americans register to vote. That year she filed a lawsuit along with Victoria Gray challenging the Mississippi poll tax statute which required voters to pay the tax before they could vote. She was one of several women active in the women's poll tax repeal movement who filed lawsuits to abolish poll tax laws. A three-judge federal panel ruled that the tax was unconstitutional in federal elections because it prohibited registered voters from casting their ballots.

In addition to Mrs. Wallace's direct work in voter registration and at considerable danger to themselves, Mr. and Mrs. Wallace boarded several white voter-registration workers and teachers for the Child Development Group of Mississippi (CDGM) during the height of the Civil Rights years in the early 1960s.

== Death and legacy ==
Wallace died on March 20, 1994, at the Conva-Rest Warren Hall in Hattiesburg. The documentary Freedom Summer was released in 2014, on the Public Broadcasting Service's series American Experience. It told the story of Wallace and other activists involved in the Freedom Summer Project.
