= Louise O. Charlton =

American judge

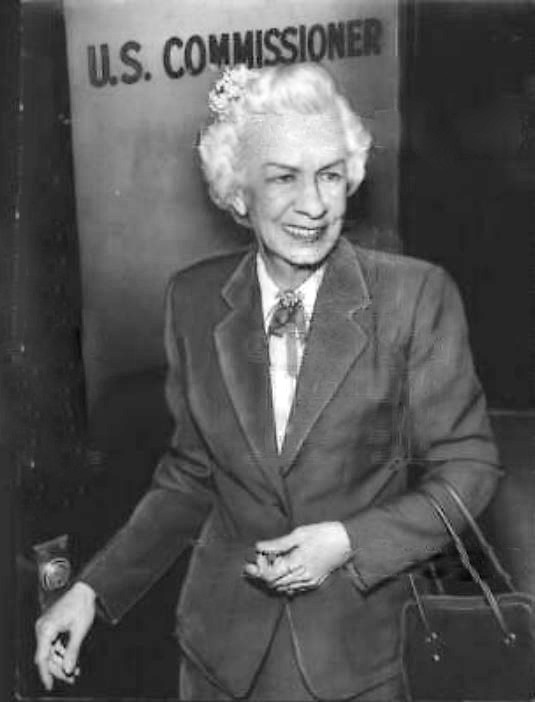
- Judge Charlton, 1955
- Born: Ida Louise Owings; January 27, 1889; Jefferson County, Kentucky
- Died: December 23, 1967 (aged 78); Birmingham, Alabama
- Other name: Louise Owings Charlton
- Occupations: teacher, judge
- Years active: 1908-1965

Louise O. Charlton (January 27, 1889 – December 23, 1967) was an American judge and U.S. Commissioner who served in Birmingham, Alabama for over four decades. Active in the women's poll tax repeal movement, she was involved in civil rights activism and conservation efforts in the state.

== Early life and education ==
Ida Louise Owings was born on January 27, 1889, in Jefferson County, Kentucky, to Olivia "Ollie" (née Shaffer) and Luther Clay Owings. Her father operated a drug store in Louisville and the family of three daughters lived at the family estate Cedar Croft near Jeffersontown. Owings attended both Louisville Girls High School and Radnor College in Nashville, Tennessee. In 1908, she was hired as an assistant teacher of primary students at the Jeffersontown Public School and in 1911, was promoted to having charge of the school, shared with Theresa McDermott. She resigned in November, but gave a month's notice and on June 6, 1912, married Kenneth C. Charlton of Birmingham, Alabama. The couple subsequently had three sons, Kenneth, Luther C. Owings II (1915–1945) who was killed in action in Burma during World War II, and David, before divorcing.

== Career ==
The couple made their home in Birmingham. Her husband was working as a US Commissioner, prompting Charlton to enroll in the Birmingham School of Law and to begin working in real estate, selling lots to develop Homewood. She became involved in the Alabama chapter of the Federation of Women's Clubs. In 1921, she was appointed chair of the organization's civics and conservation committee. She was an ardent feminist, writing "Throughout the coming ages this century will be known and recognized as the Women's Era. Her mark will stamp the Twentieth Century as time predominated by feminine influence, ideals and achievements. She has demanded and received privileges heretofore denied her".

When her marriage ended, Charlton moved back to Louisville, to take a job as a school principal, but in 1924, she was hired as a United States Commissioner, at the Birmingham federal courthouse. As a judge, she evaluated evidence regarding complaints of federal agencies. Her typical cases involved transport across state lines of stolen cars, checks stolen from the postal service, counterfeiting, or illegal transportation of liquor. Charlton remained on the bench for over 41 years, presiding, while wearing an oxygen mask, in 1965 at the hearing of Ku Klux Klansmen William Eaten, Gary Thomas Rowe, Eugene Thomas, Collie Leroy Wilkinson.

Charlton served from 1931 to 1935 on the executive committee of the Ninth District of the Alabama Democratic Committee and later was the state chair of the Democratic National Committee. She was active in the women's poll tax repeal movement. In 1938, she was chosen to organize and chair the inaugural conference of the Southern Conference for Human Welfare, an organization formed with the purpose of uniting civic, educational, and political leaders to address social conditions in the South. She worked with first lady Eleanor Roosevelt; Virginia Foster Durr a feminist and leader in the poll tax repeal movement; Clyde Helms, a prominent Baptist minister; William Mitch, district president of the United Mine Workers; and Sam E. Roper, president of the Alabama Federation of Labor, among others.

Charlton was personally attacked for her involvement in the conference and threatened by loss of her seat on the Democratic Committee. During the Red Scare and rising McCarthyism, including investigations by the House Un-American Activities Committee, Charlton resigned from the Southern Conference in 1946. Charlton remained active in environmental issues, like questioning a city plan to fluoridate Birmingham's water supply in 1953 and arguing against turning parkland into a highway in 1956.

== Death and legacy ==
Charlton died on December 23, 1967, and was buried in the Elmwood Cemetery of Birmingham.
