= Jane Sherron De Hart =

American historian

- Born: 1936 (age 89–90); Asheville, North Carolina, U.S.
- Other name: Jane DeHart Mathews
- Occupations: Feminist historian, women's studies academic
- Awards: Victoria Schuck Award (1991)

Academic background
- Education: Duke University

Academic work
- Institutions: University of North Carolina at Greensboro; University of North Carolina at Chapel Hill; University of California, Santa Barbara
- Doctoral students: Sarah Wilkerson Freeman

Jane Sherron De Hart (born 1936) is an American feminist historian and women's studies academic. She is professor emeritus at University of California, Santa Barbara. De Hart has authored and edited several works on the history of women in the United States, the Federal Theatre Project, the Equal Rights Amendment, and Ruth Bader Ginsburg. During the 1970s, she founded the women's studies program at the University of North Carolina at Greensboro.

== Early life and education ==
De Hart was born in Asheville, North Carolina, and raised in Bryson City, North Carolina. She graduated with a degree in history from Duke University. On a Carnegie Fellowship, De Hart earned a Ph.D. at Duke University in 1967. She married while attending graduate school and moved to Princeton, New Jersey, where she continued work on her dissertation and taught at Douglass College. Her dissertation on the Federal Theatre Project became her first book.

== Career ==
In 1970, De Hart joined University of North Carolina at Greensboro and was there for ten years, at first temporarily before becoming permanent professor and founding the women's studies program. She was co-bicentennial chair of American studies at University of Helsinki from 1981 to 1982. De Hart became a professor of history and director of women's studies at University of North Carolina at Chapel Hill.

In 1992, De Hart joined the University of California, Santa Barbara.

In 2018, De Hart published Ruth Bader Ginsburg: A Life. It was the first full-length biography of Ginsburg.

== Awards and honors ==
De Hart was a fellow of the National Endowment for the Humanities in 1975 and 1998. In 1991, she was awarded the Victoria Schuck Award alongside Donald G. Mathews for their book on the intersection of the Equal Rights Amendment and sex, gender, and politics.

== Selected works ==
- De Hart Mathews, Jane Sherron (1967). The Federal Theatre, 1935-1939: Plays, Relief, and Politics. Princeton University Press. ISBN 978-0-691-04515-3.
- Mathews, Donald G.; De Hart, Jane Sherron (1990). Sex, Gender, and the Politics of ERA: A State and the Nation. Oxford University Press. ISBN 978-0-19-503858-3.
- Kerber, Linda K.; De Hart-Mathews, Jane Sherron, eds. (1991). Women's America: Refocusing the Past. Oxford University Press. ISBN 978-0-19-506261-8.
- De Hart, Jane Sherron (2018). Ruth Bader Ginsburg: A Life. Knopf Doubleday Publishing Group. ISBN 978-0-525-52159-4.
