= Minnie Steckel =

American educator, psychologist and activist

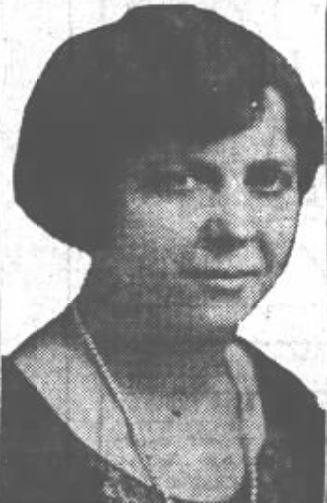
- Steckel in 1928
- Born: Minnie Louise Steckel; March 19, 1890; Woodbine, Kansas
- Died: December 1, 1952 (aged 62); Montevallo, Alabama
- Occupations: educator, psychologist, women's rights activist
- Years active: 1911–1952

Minnie Steckel (March 19, 1890 – December 1, 1952) was an American teacher, psychologist, clubwoman, and an activist involved in the women's poll tax repeal movement. Steckel began her career as a school teacher and worked her way up to school principal, superintendent and school psychologist, earning her bachelor's, master's and PhD degrees. From 1932 until her death in 1952, she was the dean of women and counselor at Alabama College. She served as president of the local Montevallo chapter of the American Association of University Women (AAUW) from 1937 to 1939, as president of the state chapter of the Business and Professional Women's Foundation and treasurer of the state chapter of the AAUW in 1951.

== Early life and education ==
Minnie Louise Steckel was born on March 19, 1890, in Woodbine, Kansas to Caroline (née Haske) and William Steckel. Her parents were immigrants from Germany and her father worked as a blacksmith. In 1906, she enrolled in the Kansas Normal School in Emporia, Kansas. She took her first teaching post in Overbrook, Kansas in 1911, and remained until 1913, when she graduated from normal school.

== Career ==
In 1914, Steckel taught in Burlingame, Kansas through the end of the May term in 1915. That summer, she enrolled at the University of Kansas in Lawrence and earned her bachelor's degree in 1917. Following her graduation, she taught at Leavenworth High School for a year and in 1918 taught at the high school in Shenandoah, Iowa. In 1919, she became the superintendent of schools in Blanchard, Iowa. She moved to the high school in Atlantic, Iowa in 1921 and served as its principal until 1924. Steckel returned to school at the University of Chicago and completed her master's degree in psychology in 1926. She was hired that year to supervise the counseling department of the Sioux City, Iowa public schools. While continuing to work in Sioux City, she completed her research on birth order and intelligence, earning her PhD with the thesis Intelligence and Birth Order in Family from the University of Chicago in 1929.

In 1930, Steckel was hired as the school counselor and dean of women for Alabama College, the state college for women. She published numerous educational and psychological books and articles and was active in numerous women's clubs including the Alabama Federation of Women’s Clubs, the Alabama Mental Hygiene Society, the American Association of University Women, the American Psychological Association, the Business and Professional Women's Foundation and the Southern Society for Philosophy and Psychology, among others. In 1936, the faculty of the college launched a project to research the impact of paying to vote on women. Steckel, who authored the report, found that women's low electoral participation was primarily a result of the poll tax requirement, instead of a lack of interest in politics.

Steckel saw her involvement in clubwork as vital for her aim to encourage and further women's achievements and help her students have more opportunities and options of employment. Among issues she prioritized were women's right to vote and to serve on juries. She also pushed for adoption of a merit based system for employment in the civil service and removal of policies which did not allow married women to work or which paid women less than men. Between 1937 and 1939, she served as president of the Montevallo chapter of the American Association of University Women and in 1940 and 1941, she was elected as president of the Alabama chapter of the Business and Professional Women's Foundation. In 1951, she served as treasurer of the state chapter of the American Association of University Women.

== Death and legacy ==
Steckel died at her home in Montevallo on December 1, 1952. A women's scholarship was named in her honor by the Alabama Federation of Women's Clubs.
