= Ronnie L. Podolefsky =

American civil rights attorney, legal historian and women's rights activist

Ronnie Lynn Podolefsky (born 1950) is an American attorney, legal historian, social justice advocate, and feminist. She has served as the president of the Iowa chapter of the National Organization for Women and was later elected to the board of the national organization.

== Early life and education ==
Ronnie Lynn Shapiro was born in 1950 and graduated from Lindenhurst Senior High School in 1967. She continued her education at Stony Brook University, earning a degree in biology and a certification in nuclear medical technology in 1971.

== Career ==
After graduation, Shapiro worked at Long Island's Brentwood Junior High, teaching biology. In 1990, she and her husband and children moved to Waterloo, Iowa, where she worked in nuclear medical technology, and returned to school, obtaining a J.D. degree from the University of Iowa College of Law.

=== Activism ===
In 1992, Podolefsky served as co-chair of the Northeast Iowa chapter of the National Organization for Women (NOW). The following year, she was elected as president of the chapter and served as treasurer on the organization's state board. Subsequently, she was president of the state board of NOW for two terms beginning in 1994, and was on the national board of the organization for four years beginning in 1998.

She was honored with the Robert S. Hunt Award in Constitutional History and her article The Illusion of Suffrage: Female Voting Rights and the Women's Poll Tax Repeal Movement After the Nineteenth Amendment won the National Feminist Jurisprudence Writing Competition, sponsored by the American University in Washington, D. C., in 1997. The article examined involvement of activists involved in the women's poll tax repeal movement from the legal and historical perspective.

=== Legal career ===
Podolefsky began her legal career working in employment discrimination law with Frerichs Law Office in 1998, but opened her own firm in 2001. She was recognized in 2003 by Friends of Iowa Civil Rights, Inc. for her work in constitutional rights, as well as employment law violations.

In 2005, she and her family moved to Warrensburg, Missouri, where her husband became president of the University of Central Missouri and Podolefsky continued her law practice. In 2006, she took a high-profile case in which six female athletes accused their high school basketball coach at Warrensburg High School of sexual misconduct. According to Associated Press reporter, Alan Scher Zagier, the case caused a "fissure" in the community and backlash against the Podolefskys; her husband's contract at the university was not renewed. The couple moved to Buffalo, New York, in 2009, but Podolefsky commuted to finish her cases. In 2010, the Warrensburg School District settled the case with the athletes, paying them $809,000. Following the settlement, Podolefsky expressed her pride in the girls, saying, "They stood up in the face of silence and spoke up for themselves".

== Personal life ==
She met her husband, Aaron Podolefsky, a colleague and fellow practitioner of Judaism, while teaching in Long Island. The couple married in June 1973 and subsequently had two sons, Noah and Isaac. The family moved to Waterloo, Iowa, in 1990, where Aaron worked as the dean of the College of Social and Behavioral Sciences at the University of Northern Iowa.

Podolefsky is an animal lover and from the 1970s has raised her own goats. She also cares for two rescue dogs, one of which she found on the side of the road in 2006, after it had been hit by a car. After her husband died in 2013, she relocated her practice to Lyons, Colorado.
