= National History Day =

Nonprofit organization

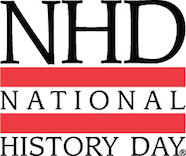
- Abbreviation: NHD
- Formation: 1974
- Type: Nonprofit Organization, Competition
- Legal status: Active
- Headquarters: University of Maryland, College Park
- Location: Maryland
- Region served: United States of America
- Members: 500,000+ students per year
- Official language: English
- Executive Director: Dr. Cathy Gorn
- Affiliations: American Association for State and Local History, American Historical Association, Federation of State Humanities Councils, National Association of Secondary School Principals, National Center for History in the Schools, National Council for History Education, National Council for the Social Studies, Organization of American Historians, Society of American Archivists
- Staff: 10
- Website: www.nhd.org

National History Day (NHD) is a non-profit which aims to "improve the teaching and learning of history." Its flagship event is an annual competition in which students in grades 6-12 develop presentations about topics in history that interest them. NHD has affiliates in all fifty states, Washington, D.C., Puerto Rico, Guam, American Samoa, South Korea, China, South Asia, and Central America. It started as a local program in Cleveland, Ohio, headed by Dr. David Van Tassel, a history professor at Case Western Reserve University. It grew from 129 students in 1974 to over 500,000 students in 48 states in 1991, and 700,000 students and 40,000 teachers in 2001. Today, more than half a million students enter through local contests. They construct entries as an individual or a group in one of five categories: documentary, exhibit board, paper, performance, or website. Students then compete in a series of regional contests with top three entries advancing to affiliate, then state contests. At state contests, the top two entries in each category and division are invited to compete at the National History Day contest. State winners then go to Maryland for a final competition, held in June for a monetary award.

In 2025, the Trump administration cut grants provided by the National Endowment for the Humanities that funded NHD.

== History ==
National History Day started in Cleveland, Ohio in 1974. Members of the History Department at Case Western Reserve University developed the initial idea for a history contest akin to a Science Fair. In 1978, they incorporated the project and hired Lois Scharf as executive director. She worked to raise grant funds and recruit state historical organizations to join the program. She served until 1992. Students gathered on campus to devote one day to history calling it "National History Day." Over the next few years, the contest expanded throughout Ohio and into surrounding Midwestern states. By 1980, with the help of the National Endowment for the Humanities, National History Day had grown into a national non-profit organization. In 1993, National History Day moved its headquarters from Cleveland to College Park, Maryland in the Washington, D.C., area. National History Day now runs multiple educational programs but the National Contest is still the largest of these.

== Annual theme ==
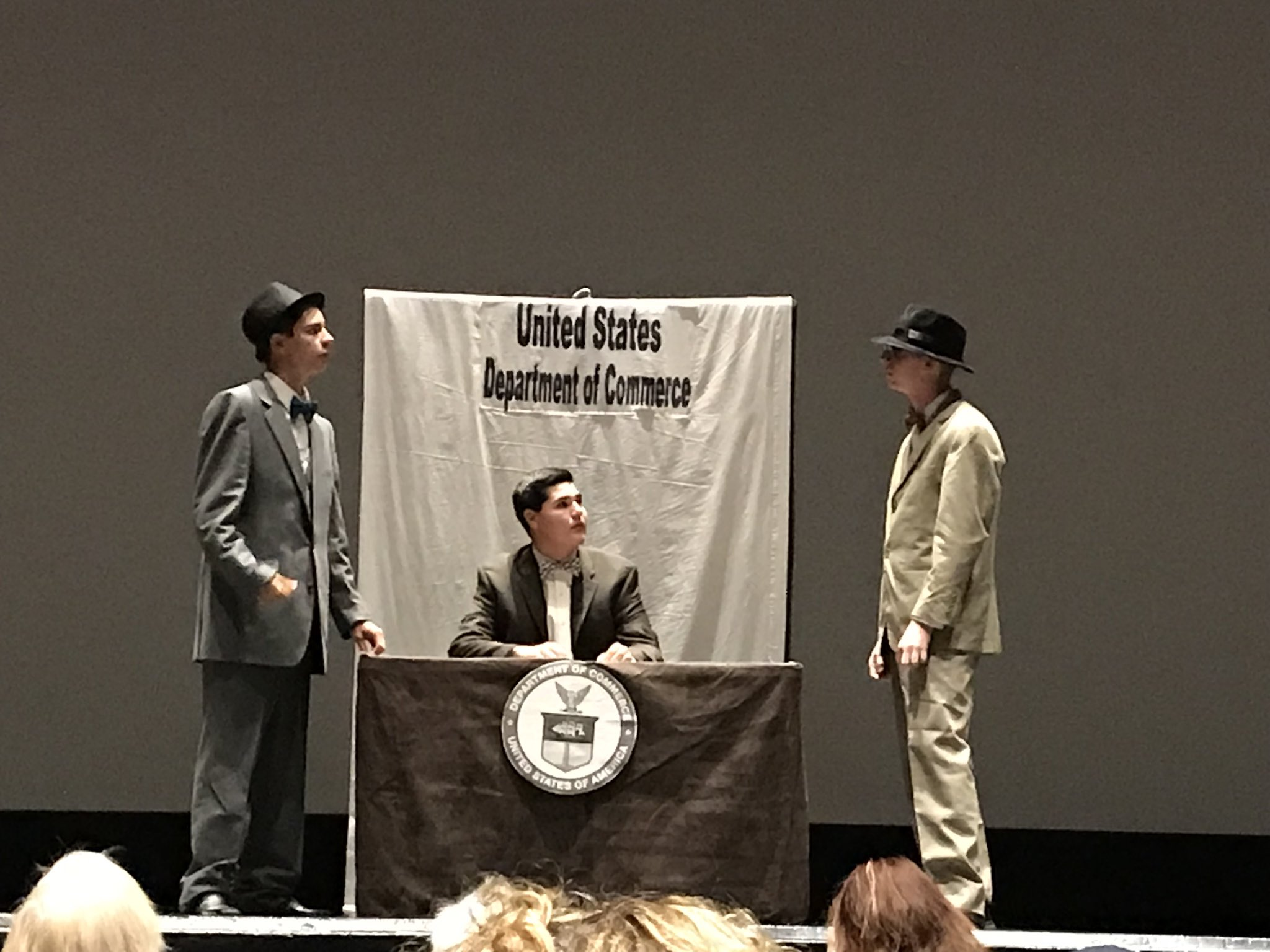
Students from New Mexico participating in the national competition in 2019.

The annual theme frames students’ research within a historical theme. It is chosen for its broad application to world, national, or state history and its relevance to ancient history or the recent past. Themes are rotated each year and prior themes can be used after approximately twelve years. For example, the latest theme was in 2025-2026, "Revolution, Reaction, and Reform in History." Additionally, the 2026-2027 theme has been released, titled, "Innovation in History: Impact, Influence, Change.” Projects are judged in part on their connection to the annual theme.

== Competition ==
=== Submissions ===
Students, either individually or as a group, can submit a project from one of the following categories: paper, exhibit, performance, documentary, or website. After reviewing the year's theme, the submission handbook, and choosing a topic, the student(s) should gather primary and secondary sources about their research. All sources need to be clearly cited in the annotated bibliography that is required for all projects. Additionally, a title page and a process paper must be submitted with each project. The process paper should include how the project's topic was chosen, how the research was conducted, how the actual project was created, the historical significance of the research, and the historical argument made in the project.

=== Judging ===
National History Day projects are judged using an evaluation form with two categories: Historical Quality (accounting for 80% of the score) and Clarity of Presentation (20% of the score). The Historical Quality category includes judging based on the strength historical arguments, research, quality of primary sources, historical accuracy, multiple perspectives, and relevant connections to the historical context.

=== State and regional competitions ===
In some regions, students who reach enough points in their judging advance to state competitions, and any number of students at regional competitions can advance to states. In other states, such as California, Connecticut, and Pennsylvania, the top three projects at the regional competition advance to the state competition. Regions can be divided by geographic area, population, or by county.

At the affiliate, then state level contests, students compete for a variety of prizes. Some states may have additional categories which do not proceed to nationals, such as California which has a Podcast category. At state level competitions, the top two entries in each category and division are invited to the National Contest, held each June at the University of Maryland, College Park.

=== National competition ===
==== Preliminaries ====
In the preliminary rounds, each entry presents its project before a panel of three judges. In the case of the paper and website categories, the projects are reviewed by the judges before the presentations, while performances, documentaries, and exhibits are seen by the judges for the first time at the presentation. The top 2 entries in the senior, and junior division advance to the national contest. Judges in each room advance one entry to the final round of judging. Each room reviews approximately 9-10 entries.

==== Finals ====
Competitors that have advanced to the final round have their projects judged by a panel of three new judges, but the students are not interviewed in this round. Their project then has to stand alone for the final judging.

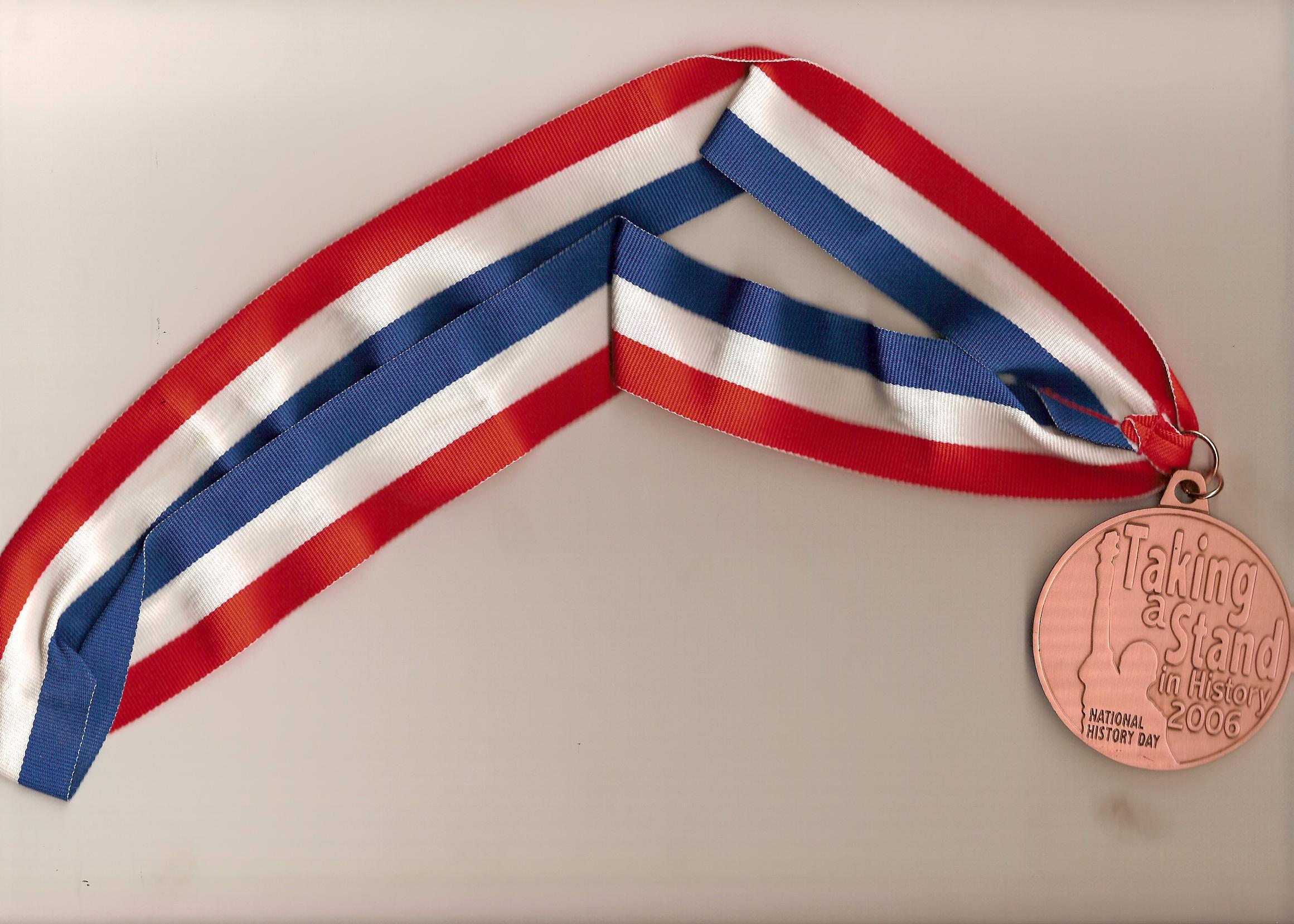
Example of a National History Day Medal

The awards for first, second, and third place at the national level are $1000, $500, and $250, respectively. "Outstanding Entry" awards are also given to two projects from each state: one junior entry and one senior entry. There are also more than a dozen special prizes awarded worth between $250 and $10,000. Special prizes may also provide special opportunities. For example, 2025 Individual documentary category winners will have the opportunity to partake in virtual mentorship sessions with filmmaker Ken Burns and Library of Congress Lavine/Ken Burns Prize for Film finalists.

==== Impact on students ====
In 2011 several researchers from Rockman et al published a study examining the competition's impact on participating students. Funded by the National History Day organization and an independent funder, the study focused on students from New Jersey, Texas, South Carolina, and Colorado, examining both students who participated in the contest and those who did not. Findings indicated that participating students were more likely to outperform the non-participating students scholastically; researchers noted that "Although it is difficult to credit any single program with student success, there are clear and consistent indications that academic performance improves with successive years of NHD participation."

=== Impact on historians ===
Arnita Jones, executive director of the American Historical Association, wrote in 2001:

Perhaps the greatest impact of National History Day...was on the historical profession itself. I truly believe that never have so many historians enjoyed engaging in the pursuit of history outside their offices, their regular classrooms, and their academic research as have the thousands who have participated in National History Day as teachers, mentors, consultants, and judges over more than two decades.

== See also ==
- Science Fair
- Paper
