= May Thompson Evans =

American teacher and government official (1901–1993)

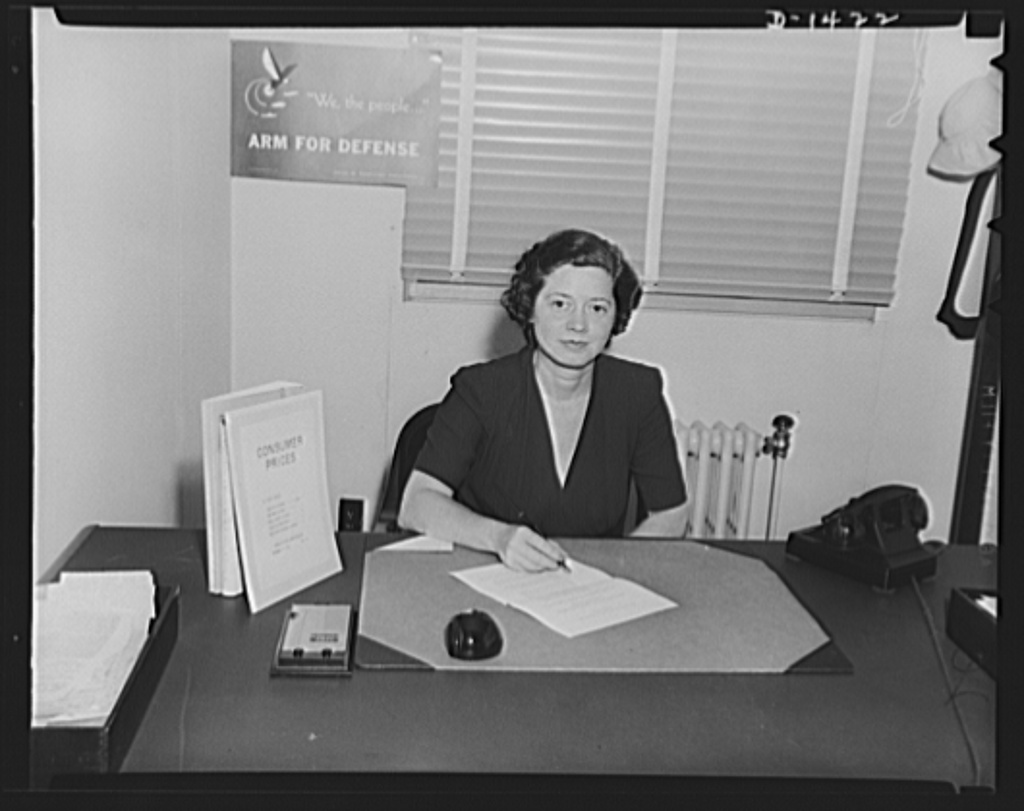
- Evans, ca. 1940
- Born: May Alcott Thompson; February 12, 1901; Lynchburg, Virginia
- Died: August 9, 1993 (aged 92); Arlington, Virginia
- Occupations: teacher, public official, activist
- Years active: 1921–1964

May Thompson Evans (February 12, 1901 – August 9, 1993) was an American public official, teacher, and activist who worked in the Office of Price Administration, the War Manpower Commission, the U.S. Department of Labor, the Federal Security Agency and finally the Department of Health, Education and Welfare. She began her career as a teacher at the Women's College of the University of North Carolina and then became the first woman to direct the North Carolina Employment Service. Later she moved to Washington, D. C. to serve as assistant director of the Women's Division of the Democratic National Committee.

== Early life and education ==
May Alcott Thompson was born on February 12, 1901, in Lynchburg, Virginia, to Mattie May (née Alcott) and Charles Judson Thompson. Her father was a Baptist minister and she spent much of her childhood in North Carolina. Her mother was a distant relative of Louisa May Alcott. She attended Meredith College in Raleigh and then completed her bachelor's degree in 1921 at Westhampton College in Richmond, Virginia.

== Career ==
After graduating, Thompson moved to Detroit, Michigan, where she taught Polish immigrant children until 1922. In 1923, moved to New York City, completing in a master's degree program in education at Columbia University. Thompson moved to Danville, Virginia, to take up a teaching post in the literary department at Averett College in 1924. Her family was living in Greensboro, North Carolina, and after her mother died in 1926, Thompson moved there and began teaching in the English department at the Woman's College of North Carolina. Her roommate at the Women's College was Harriet Elliott, an activist in the women's movement, who became influential in Thompson's development.

On July 26, 1930, at the Little Church Around The Corner in Manhattan, Thompson married William Ney Evans, a lawyer working in High Point, North Carolina, who would later become US Commissioner of Claims. Upon her marriage, Evans was required to terminate her teaching position at the Women's College. She took a post at the Salem College of Winston-Salem, North Carolina, teaching history. In 1932, Evans became the vice president of the state Young Democratic Club and the following year became its president, the first woman to serve in the post. She established the state office of the National Reemployment Service in 1933 and worked on the Ehringhaus Commission the following year, studying unemployment in the state. The study led to the establishment of a social security system for North Carolina and legislation to create the State Employment Commission in 1935. She became the founding director of the employment service in 1935, and helped establish the civil service system.

During the 1930s, Evans had become a fervent campaigner for the New Deal and in 1937, was appointed by Eleanor Roosevelt as an assistant to Mary Dewson in the Women's Division of the Democratic National Committee. She moved to Washington, D.C., and began working on increasing women's voting ability, speaking frequently for organizations involved in the women's poll tax repeal movement. Evans served in that capacity until 1940, when she became employed at the Office of Price Administration. One of her responsibilities there was to prevent black market activities, which diverted economic production and distribution from the war effort. In 1943, she was transferred to the War Manpower Commission, where her duties focused on training women to fill jobs for men who were serving in the military and evaluating which industries were essential enterprises to the war.

Evans became a field agent for the Federal Security Agency in 1949 and maintained that post until she was transferred at the request of Oveta Culp Hobby to the Public Health Service in 1954. Evans served as a field supervisor in the Department of Health, Education and Welfare until her retirement from the post 1964. She was honored for her public service by twice winning, in 1960 and 1963 the Superior Performance Award of the Public Health Service. In 1964, she was honored with the 50th Anniversary Distinguished Alumnae Award of Westhampton College and presented an honorary doctorate from the University of Richmond in Social Science. That year, she became a consumer organization liaison officer and coordinator for President Lyndon B. Johnson's Committee for Consumer Interests. In that capacity, she organized conferences throughout the country on consumer affairs. After her retirement, Evans remained active, working as a volunteer for the U.S. Commission on Aging.

== Death and legacy ==
Evans died on August 9, 1993, at Goodwin House, in Alexandria. Westhampton College, now part of the University of Richmond, provides a scholarship in her name, to an undergraduate senior political science scholar, based upon their academic record and public service record. The scholarship was initially set up by Evans in her husband's name Oral history interviews by Evans are housed in the archives at the Franklin D. Roosevelt Presidential Library and Museum (1978) and East Carolina University Manuscript Collection (1981).
