= Sarah Wilkerson Freeman =

American historian and curator

- Born: Sarah L. Wilkerson; 1956 (age 69–70)
- Occupations: Historian, curator

Academic background
- Education: University of North Carolina at Chapel Hill
- Thesis: Women and the Transformation of American Politics: North Carolina, 1898-1940 (1995)
- Doctoral advisor: Jane De Hart

Academic work
- Institutions: Arkansas State University
- Notable works: Tennessee Women: Their Lives and Times

Sarah L. Wilkerson Freeman (born 1956) is an American historian and curator who is a professor of history at Arkansas State University. She co-edited Tennessee Women: Their Lives and Times, a two-volume series with historian Beverly Greene Bond and has written on Southern women's activism from the Progressive Era to the McCarthy Era. Her curatorial work has focused on little-known chapters in Southern history, which included the fluidity of race, gender, and sexuality in 1950s New Orleans and Japanese internments in Arkansas in the 1940s.

== Early life and education ==
Sarah L. Wilkerson was born in 1956 to Daniel Coyle Wilkerson Jr., a private surgeon in Virginia, and his first wife, Rea (née Raisig). She had one sister and three brothers.

She completed her M.A. at University of North Carolina at Chapel Hill in 1985. Her thesis was titled The Emerging Political Consciousness of Gertrude Weil: Education and Women's Clubs, 1879-1914. She earned a Ph.D. at UNC Chapel Hill in 1995. Her dissertation was titled Women and the Transformation of American Politics: North Carolina, 1898-1940. Jane De Hart was her doctoral advisor.

== Career ==
Wilkerson Freeman joined the faculty at Arkansas State University in 1996 as an assistant professor of history. She was promoted to associate professor in 2001 and full professor in 2010.

With Beverly Greene Bond, Wilkerson Freeman is co-editor of Tennessee Women: Their Lives and Times, a two-volume series published in 2009 and 2015. She has also written about white women and the poll tax, and their advocacy to remove its obstacle to white women's suffrage that remained even after the Nineteenth Amendment was passed. Her studies on women's suffrage and activism in the US South have demonstrated that women were particularly active in seeking change for their communities, though their efforts in the Progressive Era strove to attain liberal socio-political change while simultaneously perpetuating white supremacy and racist policies. Her work has also explored Southern women's drive for change, regional engagement, and increasing involvement in the Democratic Party during the 1930s.

Wilkerson Freeman has also served as an art curator, working on photographic collections like the archives of photographer Jack Robinson and creating an exhibit of rare photographs of the Rohwer Japanese American internment camp in Arkansas. Her work on Robinson began when Dan Oppenheimer, a Memphis art salesman who had employed Robinson as a stained-glass artist, inherited around 150,000 negatives when Robinson died. Unaware that Robinson had been a Vogue photographer, he contacted Wilkerson Freeman to review the negatives. She discovered that they were an archive documenting New Orleans' Canal Street, Mardi Gras festivities, and the fluidity of race, gender, and sexuality in the McCarthy era. In 2013, the curated exhibit was shown at the Sheraton New Orleans.

Wilkerson Freeman's project on Rohwer began in 2012 when she was contacted by the children of Paul and Ann Faris, who had photographed subjects of the camp in 1945. The Faris couple took the photographs and conducted interviews for Allen H. Eaton's book, Beauty Behind Barbed Wire: The Arts of the Japanese in Our War Relocation Camps. The couple were educators in the 1940s and journalists in the 1950s—Paul wrote for the Arkansas Democrat and Ann freelanced for the Arkansas Gazette. Sorting through 10,000 negatives, Wilkerson Freeman selected photographs which would preserve the history of the internment camps. They were first displayed at Arkansas State University in April 2014, and then the exhibit toured as far away as Memphis and San Francisco. The second exhibition on the camps included additional photographs by the Faris couple and was held in Butler Center for Arkansas Studies from August to December 2017. Two additional exhibitions were planned for 2018.

== Personal life ==
She and her husband Herschel Freeman have two children. They reside in Germantown, Tennessee.

== Selected works ==
- Wilkerson-Freeman, Sarah (July 1991). "From Clubs to Parties: North Carolina Women in the Advancement of the New Deal". North Carolina Historical Review. 68 (3). Raleigh, North Carolina: North Carolina Department of Natural and Cultural Resources: 320–339. ISSN 0029-2494. OCLC 5790499297.
- Wilkerson-Freeman, Sarah (May 2002). "The Second Battle for Woman Suffrage: Alabama White Women, the Poll Tax, and V. O. Key's Master Narrative of Southern Politics". The Journal of Southern History. 68 (2). Athens, Georgia: Southern Historical Association: 333–374. doi:10.2307/3069935. ISSN 0022-4642. JSTOR 3069935.
- Wilkerson-Freeman, Sarah (Winter 2002). "The Creation of a Subversive Feminist Dominion: Interracialist Social Workers and the Georgia New Deal". Journal of Women's History. 13 (4). Johns Hopkins University Press: 132–154. doi:10.1353/jowh.2002.0013. ISSN 1042-7961. OCLC 936907285. S2CID 145554650. – via Project MUSE (subscription required)
- Wilkerson-Freeman, Sarah (2003). "Pauline Van De Graaf Orr (1861-1955): Feminist Education in Mississippi". In Swain, Martha H.; Payne, Elizabeth Anne; Spruill, Marjorie Julian (eds.). Mississippi Women: Their Histories, Their Lives. Vol. 1. Athens, Georgia: University of Georgia Press. pp. 72–94. ISBN 978-0-8203-2503-3.
- Wilkerson-Freeman, Sarah (2003). "Stealth in the Political Arsenal of Southern Women: A Retrospective for the Millennium". In Walker, Melissa; Dunn, Jeanette R.; Dunn, Joe P. (eds.). Southern Women at the Millennium: A Historical Perspective. Columbia, Missouri: University of Missouri Press. pp. 42–82. ISBN 978-0-8262-6456-5.
- Wilkerson-Freeman, Sarah (2006). "Fat Tuesday at Dixie's: Jack Robinson's New Orleans Mardi Gras Photographs, 1952-1955". Southern Cultures. 12 (1). Chapel Hill, North Carolina: Center for the Study of the American South: 42–63. doi:10.1353/scu.2006.0015. ISSN 1534-1488. JSTOR 26391110. OCLC 5183545478. S2CID 144641207.
- Bond, Beverly Greene; Wilkerson Freeman, Sarah; Helper-Ferris, Laura, eds. (2009). Tennessee Women: Their Lives and Times. Vol. 1. University of Georgia Press. ISBN 978-0-8203-2949-9.
- Bond, Beverly Greene; Wilkerson Freeman, Sarah, eds. (2015). Tennessee Women: Their Lives and Times. Vol. 2. University of Georgia Press. ISBN 978-0-8203-3743-2.
- Wilkerson-Freeman, Sarah (2014). "Sarah Cowan 'Daisy' Denson (1863-1952): The Lost Matriarch of State Public Welfare Reform". In Gillespie, Michele; McMillen, Sally G. (eds.). North Carolina Women: Their Lives and Times. Athens, Georgia: University of Georgia Press. pp. 263–290. ISBN 978-0-8203-4654-0.
- Wilkerson-Freeman, Sarah (2014). "Politics, Women in, 1700s to 1920 and Politics, Women in, 1920 to Present". In Bercaw, Nancy; Ownby, Ted (eds.). The New Encyclopedia of Southern Culture. Vol. 13: Gender. University of North Carolina Press. pp. 211–223. ISBN 978-1-4696-1672-8.
