= Dorothy Stafford (activist) =

American public service administrator and women's rights activist

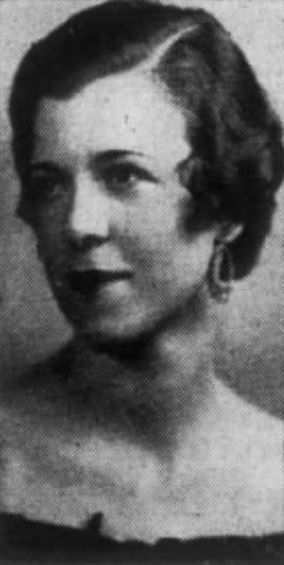
- Stafford, newly elected League of Women Voter's president, 1937
- Born: Dorothy Davenport; March 14, 1905; Plymouth, North Carolina, US
- Died: May 22, 1997 (aged 92); Hilton Head Island, South Carolina, US
- Occupations: public service worker, writer, and activist

Dorothy Stafford (March 14, 1905 – May 22, 1997) was an American public service administrator and women's rights activist. She organized the formation of the League of Women Voters branch in Knoxville and became very involved in community improvement projects. She also served as president of the state chapter of the League. She was active in the women's poll tax repeal movement, which eventually helped secure a constitutional amendment abolishing collecting poll tax as a precursor to registering to vote. Later she moved to Atlanta and worked as a journalist.

== Early life and education ==
Dorothy Davenport was born on March 14, 1905, in Plymouth, Washington County, North Carolina, to Mary S. (née Tucker) and Peter Ernest Davenport. Her father operated a pharmacy, and the family lived in Plymouth and later in Beaufort. As a young woman, she moved to New York City and worked with Carrie Chapman Catt in organizing the League of Women Voters. In 1930, she married Edward Bass Lucas at Fifth Avenue Presbyterian Church in Manhattan. They later divorced and on September 29, 1933, she married Carl Victor Stafford at Riverside Church. He was from Tennessee, and the couple settled in Knoxville, where their daughter Diane was born.

== Career and activism ==
Stafford was instrumental in organizing the League of Women Voters chapter in Knoxville. She put an advertisement in the newspaper and convinced Martha Ragland to join her in founding the group. Stafford was elected president of the East Tennessee chapter in 1937, and later served as state president. In 1941, League of Women Voter members joined with the Industrial Council, the Tennessee Farm Bureau, the Tennessee State Grange, the YWCA, and 30 other civic and professional groups to found the Committee for Majority Rule. The goal of the group was to continue to press for the repeal of the poll tax; its officers were Jennings Perry, chair; Stafford, eastern vice chair; Alton Lawrence, middle Tennessee vice chair; and Katharine Fulling, western vice chair.

By the mid-1940s, Stafford was working for the City of Knoxville. She served as the city's safety director until March 1946 and then transferred to direct the city welfare program. She continued in this post the following year, while also serving as president of the Council of Community Agencies. By the early 1970s, the Staffords were living in Atlanta, where Dorothy was working as a journalist at The Atlanta Constitution. She also published in Atlanta Magazine and Modern Maturity. In the 1980s, she moved to Hilton Head Island and published cookbooks with her daughter.

== Death and legacy ==
Stafford died on May 22, 1997, at her home in Hilton Head.

== Selected works ==
- Mayes, Dianne Stafford; Stafford, Dorothy Davenport (1983). Rush Hour Superchef!: With Step-by-Step Menus. Carthage, Missouri: Dèanne II, Inc. OCLC 12987925.
- Mayes, Dianne Stafford; Stafford, Dorothy Davenport (1989). It's Christmas: Easy and Festive Do-It-Ahead Menus and Recipes. Carthage, Missouri: Dèanne II, Inc. OCLC 1150014069.
