= Florence Lewis (activist) =

American activist

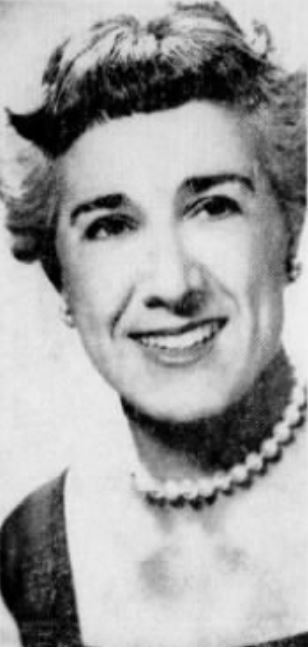
- Lewis, 1965
- Born: Florence B. Axelrod; November 5, 1905; Chicago, Illinois, US
- Died: November 26, 1990 (aged 85); North Lauderdale, Florida, US
- Other name: Florence Axelrod Lewis
- Occupations: activist, civic worker, and interior decorator
- Children: 1

Florence Lewis (November 5, 1905 – November 26, 1990) was an American activist, civic worker, and interior decorator. She was active in the women's poll tax repeal movement and encouraged school integration through her membership in the National Council of Jewish Women. She served as president of the Miami chapter of the National Council of Jewish Women and was also on the board of the national organization. She was honored with their inaugural Hannah G. Solomon Award for public service in 1967.

== Early life and education ==
Florence B. Axelrod was born on November 5, 1905, in Chicago, Illinois, to Esther (née Leitchinger) and David Axelrod. Her parents were immigrants from Ukraine, at the time part of the Russian Empire. Her father was from Kremenchuk and her mother was from Kyiv. They moved to the United States in 1904, settling in Chicago, where her father operated a tailor's shop. She was the oldest child and had three younger sisters, Jeanette, Myrtle, and Harriet, all of whom spoke Yiddish.

After graduating from Carl Schurz High School in 1922, Axelrod entered Northwestern University and graduated with a degree in secondary education. In the early 1930s, she married Sidney L. Lewis with whom she had a son James. They moved to Miami, Florida where Sid owned and operated a furniture business.

== Activism ==
Lewis became an active clubwoman in the 1940s, joining the Miami chapter of Alpha Epsilon Phi, and serving as a Dean of the organization in 1952; the Women's Division of the American Jewish Congress, for which she was elected vice president in 1947; and the National Council of Jewish Women (NCJW). She became president of the Miami chapter of the NCJW in 1960 and served two years before being elected in 1963 to the national board. From the end of the war until the early 1950s, she worked as chair of the NCJW's Good Neighbor Committee, trying to assist newly arriving Jewish settlers in refugee camps. As a linguist, she was able to assist them in learning English and acclimatizing to life in the United States.

In the 1950s, Lewis worked on women's rights and civil rights issues, including testifying to the US Congress on poll tax repeal and integration of schools in the United States. She was involved in planning and organizing the opening of the first Dade County senior citizen's center, the Malcom Ross Senior Day Center, in Miami in 1960, and also served as the first secretary of the Coral Gables Jewish Center. In 1963, she was one of 250 clubwomen invited by President John F. Kennedy to the White House for a discussion on how women's organizations could help solve civil rights issues in the country; her opinion was that women volunteers could assist schools in bringing educational levels to a more equal status.

Lewis served on the regional board for the Anti-Defamation League and the United Hebrew Immigrant Aid Society. In 1965, she directed the program Women in Community Service, Inc., which recruited girls for participation in the federal Job Corps program and offered them other opportunities to overcome poverty. She was also involved in the anti-poverty Wider Horizons Program. In 1967, the Miami chapter of the NCJW awarded her their inaugural Hannah G. Solomon Award for public service, particularly regarding her work with young women. In addition to her clubwork, Lewis worked as an interior decorator and helped her husband in the furniture store until it closed in 1980.

== Death and legacy ==
Sidney died in January 1990 and Lewis died 10 months later on November 26, 1990. At the time of her death, she was living in North Lauderdale, Florida, with her son. She was buried at Mt. Nebo Kendall Memorial Gardens Cemetery in Miami.
