= Dorah Sterne =

American civic leader

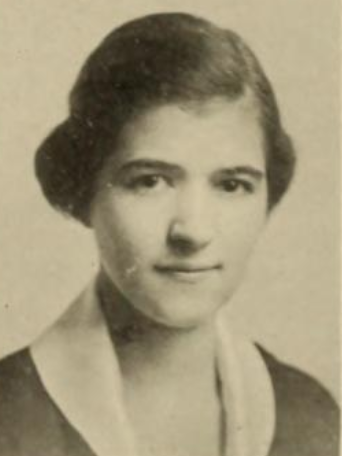
- Dorah Sterne, from the 1919 yearbook of Smith College
- Born: Dorah Heyman; 1896; Atlanta, Georgia
- Died: April 9, 1994 (age 97); Birmingham, Alabama
- Occupations: Civic leader, philanthropist, clubwoman
- Spouse: Mervyn H. Sterne

Dorah Sterne (1896 – April 9, 1994), born Dorah Heyman, was an American clubwoman and philanthropist, "a prominent figure in the civic and cultural life" of Birmingham, Alabama.

== Early life ==
Dorah Heyman was born in Atlanta, Georgia, the daughter of Arthur Heyman and Minna Simon Heyman. Both of her parents were born in the American South. Her father was a lawyer. The Heymans were a prominent Southern Jewish family. In 1911, she won a gold medal in an essay contest sponsored by the United Daughters of the Confederacy. She graduated from Smith College in 1919. In 1985, she was presented with the Smith College Medal, as a distinguished alumna.

== Career ==
In Birmingham, Alabama, after she married, Sterne was active in a range of community leadership roles. She was president of the Birmingham chapter of the National Council of Jewish Women. In 1925, she presided at a meeting of the Southern Interstate Conference of Jewish Women. She was elected commissioner of the Birmingham Girl Scout Council in 1931. She was involved with the Birmingham Little Theater. She was a leader of the Birmingham League of Women Voters from the 1930s into the 1980s; she was honored by the League with a life membership in 1982.

During World War II, the Sternes sponsored families of German Jewish refugees, and helped them settle in Alabama. The Sternes' philanthropic interests extended to libraries, museums, hospitals, mental health, and civil rights in Birmingham. She was appointed chair of Birmingham's Motion Picture Review Board when it was formed in 1953.

Sterne gave an oral history interview to the Birmingham Public Library in 1985.

=== AAUW and prison reform work ===
Sterne was president of the Birmingham branch of the American Association of University Women. Supported by the AAUW, she led "a vigorous campaign for prison reform in Alabama." She served on the state's 1948 Prison Investigating Committee, and arranging for radios for women prisoners. She also organized the sale of rugs made by women prisoners. She lectured about her prison reform work to women's clubs in Selma in 1948.

=== University of Alabama at Birmingham ===
The Sternes' social circle included University of Alabama at Birmingham administrator John U. Monro. She endowed the Sterne Library at the named in her husband's memory. In 1986, she received an honorary life membership in the University of Alabama at Birmingham Alumni Society, for her contributions to the school. The Sterne Family Papers are at the University of Alabama at Birmingham Archives.

== Personal life and legacy ==
In 1922, Dorah Heyman married banker Mervyn Hayden Sterne. They had one daughter, also named Dorah, called Dody. Her husband died in 1973, and Sterne died in 1994, aged 97 years. In 2008, the Sterne's antebellum home on Tyler Road in Birmingham, which was listed in the Alabama Register of Landmarks and Heritage as the Chamblee-Sterne House, was torn down.
