= Lois Scharf =

American historian and writer

Lois Scharf (born August 21, 1934) is an American historian and writer specialized in women's history, family organization, and feminism. She served as the executive director of the National History Day program from 1978 to 1992. Scharf has taught at John Carroll University and Case Western Reserve University.

== Career ==
She received her Bachelor of Arts degree in 1956 from the University of Michigan. After completing a master's degree in 1971 at John Carroll University, she taught there until 1977. She was one of the early researchers into women's history, when women's studies courses began in the 1970s. She completed her PhD in 1977 at Case Western Reserve University with the thesis The Employment of Married Women during the Depression, 1929–1941, studying under David Van Tassel. From 1978 to 1992, she was the executive director of the National History Day program. Van Tassel, recruited Scharf for the post and her job entailed expanding the state-wide History Day project in Ohio to a National program. She was responsible for obtaining grants to fund the program and recruiting state historical organizations to join in the program. Under her leadership the program expanded from 19,000 student participants in the inaugural year of the contest to over 500,000 students in 1991. During the time that she served as executive director, she worked as an adjunct professor and lectured at Case Western Reserve University. She also published articles and reviews expanding the knowledge of women's working conditions, family organization, and feminism in the interwar period. Her book on Eleanor Roosevelt examined the first lady's place in the history of feminism, as though Roosevelt encouraged women to break boundaries, she openly opposed passage of the Equal Rights Amendment.

== Selected works ==
- Scharf, Lois (1975). Marriage and Careers: Feminism in the 1920s. Women Historians of the Midwest, Conference on the History of Women, October 24–25, 1975. Saint Paul, Minnesota: College of St. Catherine.
- Scharf, Lois (June 10, 1976). Economic Discrimination Against Married Women During the Depression. Berkshire Conference on Women's History. Bryn Mawr, Pennsylvania: Bryn Mawr College.
- Scharf, Lois (1977). The Employment of Married Women during the Depression, 1929–1941 (PhD). Cleveland, Ohio: Case Western Reserve University. OCLC 6714321.
- Scharf, Lois (April 17, 1979). 'The Forgotten Woman': Working Women, The New Deal and Women's Organizations. Status of Women Conference, New York. Bloomington, Indiana: Organization of American Historians.
- Scharf, Lois (1980). To Work and to Wed: Female Employment, Feminism, and the Great Depression. Westport, Connecticut: Greenwood Press. ISBN 978-0-313-21445-5.
- Scharf, Lois; Ware, Susan (September 1983). "Holding Their Own: American Women in the 1930s". The Journal of American History. 70 (2). Bloomington, Indiana: Organization of American Historians: 455. doi:10.2307/1900287. ISSN 0021-8723. JSTOR 1900287.
- Scharf, Lois; Jensen, Joan M., eds. (1987). Decades of Discontent: The Women's Movement, 1920–1940 (2nd ed.). Boston, Massachusetts: Northeastern University Press. ISBN 978-1-55553-013-6. 1st edition 1983.
- Scharf, Lois (1984). "The Great Uprising in Cleveland: When Sisterhood Failed". In Jensen, Joan M.; Davidson, Sue (eds.). A Needle, a Bobbin, a Strike: Women Needleworkers in America. Philadelphia, Pennsylvania: Temple University Press. pp. 146–148. ISBN 978-0-87722-340-5.
- Scharf, Lois (1987). Eleanor Roosevelt: First Lady of American Liberalism. Boston, Massachusetts: Twayne Publishers. ISBN 978-0-8057-7769-7.
