= Alabama Library Association =

Professional association for librarians in Alabama

- Nickname: ALLA
- Formation: November 21, 1904; 121 years ago
- Tax ID no.: 51-0173726
- Headquarters: Montgomery, Alabama
- President, Executive Council: Laura Pitts
- Parent organization: American Library Association
- Website: www.allanet.org

Previous logo

The Alabama Library Association (ALLA) is a professional organization for Alabama's librarians and library workers. It is headquartered in Montgomery, Alabama. It was founded on November 21, 1904, in Montgomery. Thomas Owen, director of the Alabama Department of Archives, was the association's first President from 1904 through 1920.

Before the 1960s, ALLA was only open to White members. ALLA members attempted to allow Black membership between 1949 and 1953. ALLA executive council unanimously supported the idea, and created a Biracial Committee with ten Black librarians and six White ALA members. During this time of study, several Black librarians paid dues to join ALLA which were refunded when ALLA could not offer them "full membership privileges." The Biracial Committee was disbanded after three years when they could not come to an agreement on how to integrate the association and also work within the state segregation laws of the time.

ALLA lost their ALA State Chapter status when they refused to admit Black members. ALLA council passed a motion stating "it is the intent and will of this Executive Council... (just as soon as local, municipal, and state ordinances permit) to give full consideration to the acceptance of qualified librarians, of whatever race, to membership in this association." The association withdrew from chapter status since it could not comply with chapter requirements" After the Civil Rights Act of 1964 outlawed segregation, ALLA council passed an official resolution barring screening of membership applications based on race on December 4, 1964. ALLA held its first desegregated meeting in the Spring of 1965.

The organization maintains an Alabama Authors database, and holds an annual convention at rotating locations throughout the state.

== Divisions ==
The Alabama Library Association has three divisions.

- College, University and Special Libraries (CUS)
- Public Library (PLD)
- Youth Services and School Library (YSSLD)

== See also ==
- List of libraries in the United States
