= Timeline of voting rights in the United States =

This is a timeline of voting rights in the United States, documenting when women and non-White men in the country gained the right to vote or were disenfranchised.

== 1700s ==
=== 1780s ===
1789

- The Constitution of the United States recognizes that the states have the power to set voting requirements. A few states allowed free Black men to vote, and New Jersey also included unmarried and widowed women who owned property. Generally, states limited this right to property-owning or tax-paying White males (about 6% of the population).
- Georgia removes property requirement for voting.

=== 1790s ===
1790

- The Naturalization Act of 1790 allows free White persons born outside of the United States to become citizens. However, since each state set its own requirements for voting, this Act (and its successor Naturalization Act of 1795) did not automatically grant these naturalized citizens the right to vote.

1791

- Vermont is admitted as a new state, giving the vote to all men regardless of color or property ownership.

1792

- New Hampshire removes property ownership as requirement to vote.
- Kentucky is admitted as a new state, giving the vote to free men regardless of color or property ownership, although the vote would shortly be taken away from free Black people.
- Delaware removes property ownership as requirement to vote, but continues to require that voters pay taxes.

1798

- Georgia removes tax requirement for voting.

== 1800s ==
1800

- Only three states, Kentucky, New Hampshire, and Vermont, have universal white male suffrage.

1807

- Voting rights are taken away from free black men and all women in New Jersey.

1819

- Economic crisis stemming from the Panic of 1819 led to greater calls from propertyless men for the abolition of restrictions to voting; by 1830, the number of states with universal white male suffrage had risen to ten, although six still had property qualifications and eight had taxpaying qualifications. Territories on the frontier, eager to attract new settlers, also helped expand suffrage.

1821

- In 1821, the state of New York held a constitutional convention which removed property requirements for white male voters, but required that "persons of colour" own $250 worth of property, "over and above all debts," in order to vote. White male voters were instead required to pay a tax, but this rule was abolished in an amendment of 1826. Requirements for persons of color were not affected by this amendment. Due to the state's policy of gradual emancipation, slavery persisted until 1827, but until then the proportion of African Americans who were free (and thus potential voters) steadily increased. Native Americans still controlled large territories in Upstate New York, and though typically excluded from citizenship altogether, the property requirement applied to any voter who was not white.

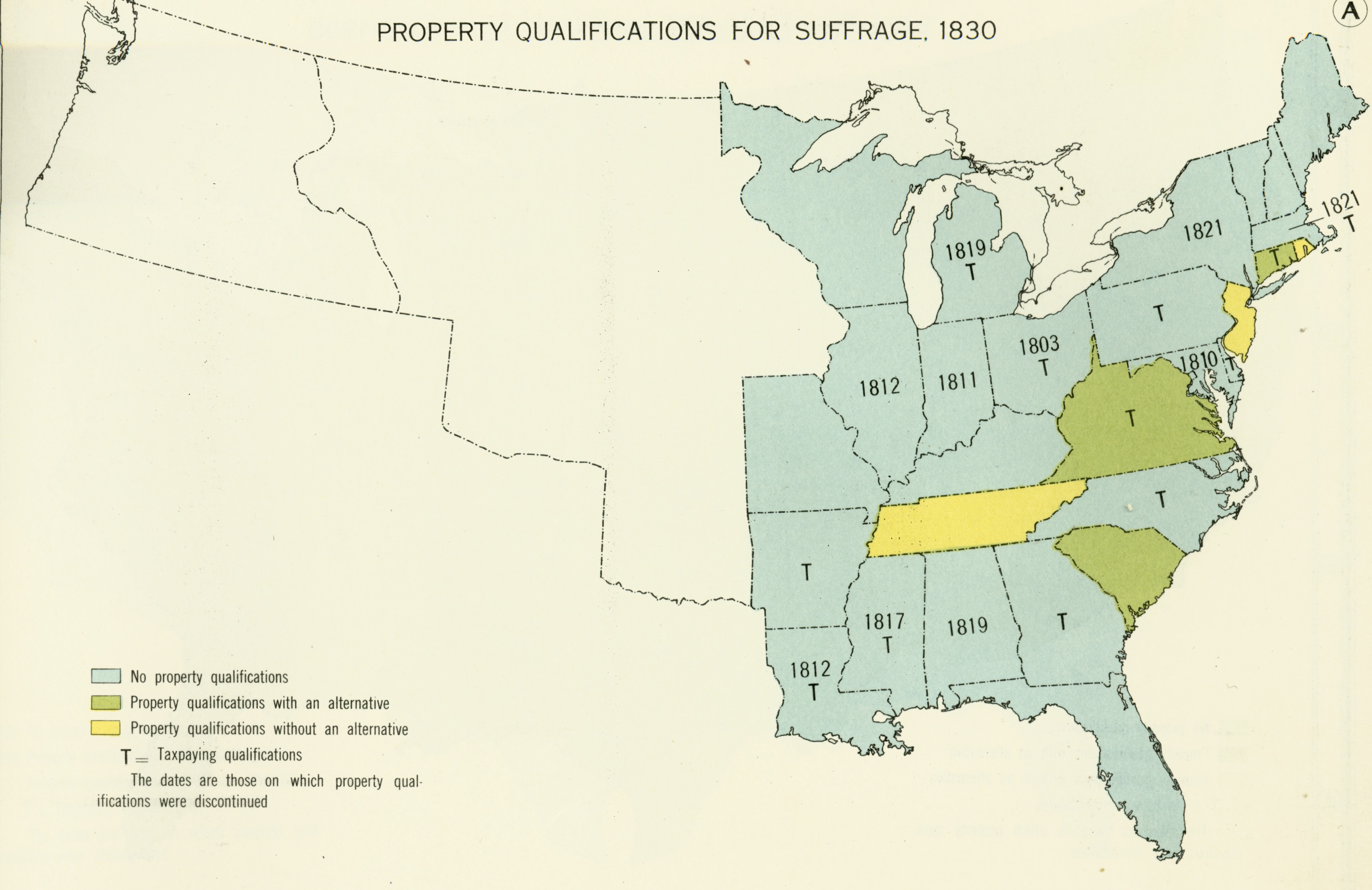
Property qualifications for suffrage in the United States

1828

- The 1828 presidential election was the first in which non-property-holding white males could vote in the vast majority of states. By the end of the 1820s, attitudes and state laws had shifted in favor of universal white male suffrage.
- Maryland passes a law to allow Jews to vote. Maryland was the last state to remove religious restrictions for voting.

=== 1830s ===
1837

- Voting rights are taken away from free black men in Pennsylvania.

1838

- Kentucky women are allowed to vote in school elections.

=== 1840s ===
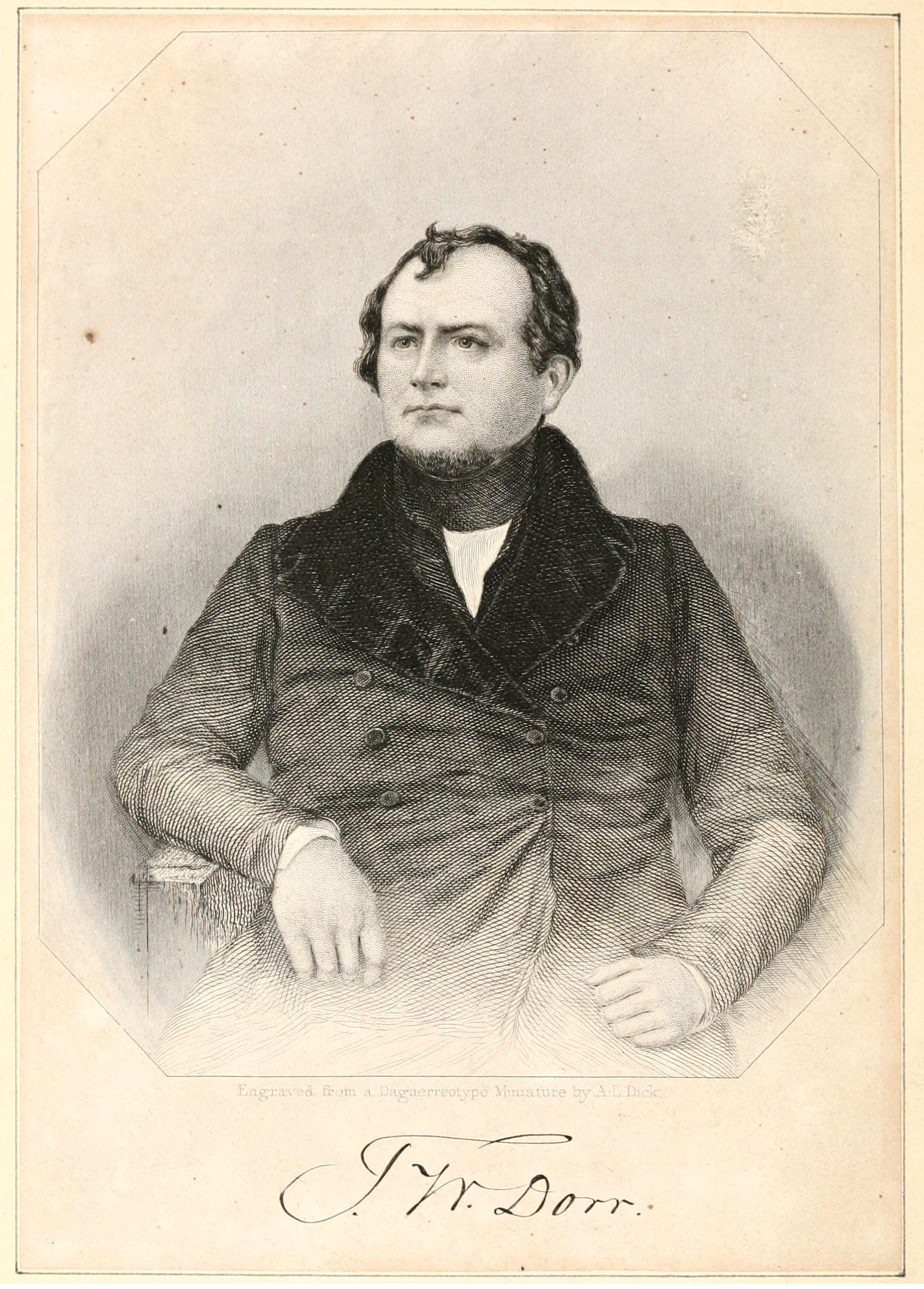
Thomas Wilson Dorr of Rhode Island

1840

- Voter turnout soared during the 1830s, reaching about 80% of adult white male population in the 1840 presidential election.

1841

- The Dorr Rebellion takes place in Rhode Island because men who did not own land could not vote.

1843

- Rhode Island drafts a new constitution extending voting rights to any free men regardless of whether they own property, provided they pay a $1 poll tax. Naturalized citizens are still not eligible to vote unless they own property.

1848

- Mexicans living in US territories are declared citizens in the Treaty of Guadalupe Hidalgo, but are often discouraged from voting.

=== 1850s ===
1856

- The last state to abolish property qualification was North Carolina.

=== 1860s ===
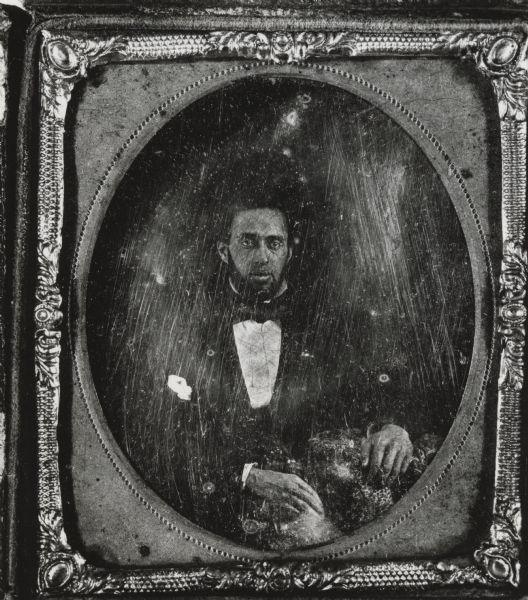
Ezekiel Gillespie, c. 1850, who won a landmark voting-rights decision in Wisconsin

1860

- Tax-paying qualifications remained in five states in 1860 – Massachusetts, Rhode Island, Pennsylvania, Delaware and North Carolina. They survived in Pennsylvania and Rhode Island until the 20th century. In addition, many poor whites were later disenfranchised.

1866

- Wisconsin gives black men the right to vote after Ezekiel Gillespie fights for his right to vote.

1867

- Congress passes the District of Columbia Suffrage Act over Andrew Johnson's veto, granting voting rights all free men living in the District, regardless of racial background.

1868

- Citizenship is guaranteed to all male persons born or naturalized in the United States by the Fourteenth Amendment to the United States Constitution, setting the stage for future expansions to voting rights.
- November 3: The right of black men to vote in Iowa is approved through a voter referendum.

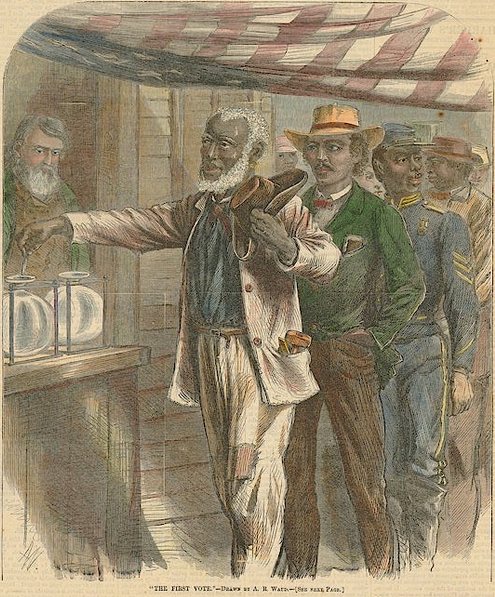
"The First Vote" by Alfred Waud (1867)

1869

- Women in Wyoming get equal suffrage rights.

=== 1870s ===
1870

- The Fifteenth Amendment to the United States Constitution prevents states from denying the right to vote on grounds of "race, color, or previous condition of servitude".
  - Disfranchisement after the Reconstruction era began soon after. Former Confederate states passed Jim Crow laws and amendments to effectively disfranchise black and poor white voters through poll taxes, literacy tests, grandfather clauses and other restrictions, applied in a discriminatory manner. During this period, the Supreme Court generally upheld state efforts to discriminate against racial minorities; only later in the 20th century were these laws ruled unconstitutional. Black males in the Northern states could vote, but the majority of black males lived in the South.
- Women in Utah get the right to vote.

1875

- Minor v. Happersett goes to the Supreme Court, where it is decided that suffrage is not a right of citizenship and women do not necessarily have the right to vote.

1876

- Native Americans are ruled non-citizens and ineligible to vote by the Supreme Court of the United States.
- Virginia amends their state constitution to include paying a poll tax as a requirement to vote.
- Connecticut amends its constitution to remove the requirement of being white to vote.

=== 1880s ===
1882

- Chinese immigrants lose the right to become citizens and thus the ability to gain the right to vote through the Chinese Exclusion Act. (Note: Chinese-Americans born in the United States had birthright citizenship and thus the right to vote, as upheld by the Supreme Court in United States v. Wong Kim Ark.)
- Virginia amends their state constitution to eliminate paying the poll tax as a requirement to vote.

1883

- Women in Washington Territory earn the right to vote.

1887

- Citizenship is granted to Native Americans who are willing to disassociate themselves from their tribe by the Dawes Act, making those males technically eligible to vote, however they were not considered “white” in many southern states and were routinely turned away at voting booths as were many other ethnicities that modern people would not view as “non-white” such as Italians, Greeks, and Irish.
- Women in Washington lose the right to vote.
- Women in Utah lose the right to vote under the Edmunds–Tucker Act.
- Kansas women earn the right to vote in municipal elections.
- Arizona, Montana, New Jersey, North Dakota, and South Dakota grant partial suffrage to women.

=== 1890s ===
1890

- Native Americans can apply for citizenship through the Indian Naturalization Act.

1893

- Colorado passes full women's suffrage.
- Women in Connecticut gain the right to vote for school officials.

1894

- Kentucky women are granted school suffrage voting rights in Covington, Lexington, and Newport.

1896

- Women in Utah regain the right to vote.
- Grandfather clauses are enacted in Louisiana in order to disenfranchise black voters.
- Women's suffrage is won in Idaho.

1899

- The right to vote in the territory of Hawaii is restricted to English and Hawaiian speaking men and the territory is not allowed to make its own suffrage legislation.

== 1900s ==
1901

- Alabama enacts a cumulative poll tax in their state constitution. This means that all taxes that should have been paid since an eligible voter turned 21 must be paid before voting.

1902

- Virginia amends their state constitution to bring back the poll tax as a requirement to vote.
- Women's limited school suffrage voting rights in Kentucky is repealed.

=== 1910s ===
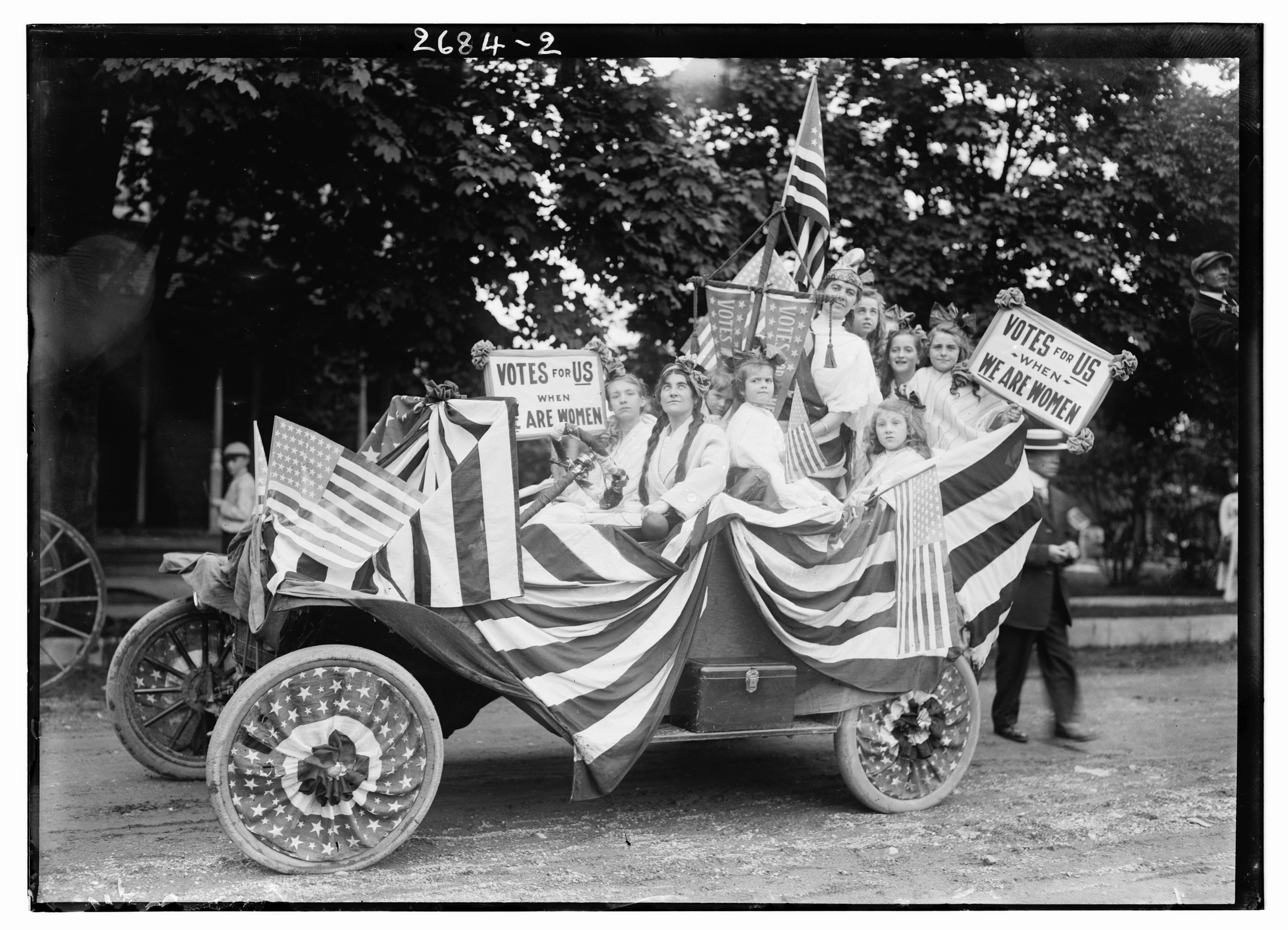
Suffragists in parade

1910

- Washington state restores women's right to vote through the state constitution.

1911

- California women are granted the right to vote following the passage of California Proposition 4.

1912

- Women in Arizona and Kansas are granted the right to vote.
- Women in Oregon are granted the right to vote.

1913

- Direct election of Senators, established by the Seventeenth Amendment to the United States Constitution, gave voters rather than state legislatures the right to elect senators.
- White and African American women in the Territory of Alaska earn the right to vote.
- Women in Illinois are granted the right to vote in presidential elections.

1914

- Nevada and Montana women are granted the right to vote.

1917

- Women in Arkansas are granted the right to vote in primary elections.
- Women in Rhode Island are granted the right to vote in presidential elections.
- Women in Vermont are granted the right to vote for some elected positions at the city and town level.
- Women in New York, Oklahoma, and South Dakota earn equal suffrage through their state constitutions.

1918

- Women in Texas are granted the right to vote in primary elections.
- Women in South Dakota earn the right to vote with the passage of the Citizenship Amendment.

=== 1920s ===
1920

- Women are guaranteed the right to vote by the Nineteenth Amendment to the United States Constitution. In practice, the same restrictions that hindered the ability of non-white men to vote now also applied to non-white women.

1923

- Texas passes a white primary law.

1924

- All Native Americans are granted citizenship and the right to vote through the Indian Citizenship Act, regardless of tribal affiliation. By this point, approximately two thirds of Native Americans were already citizens. Notwithstanding, some western states continued to bar Native Americans from voting until 1957. South Dakota refused to follow the law.

1925

- Alaska passes a literacy test designed to disenfranchise Alaska Native voters.

1926

- Georgia passes a cumulative poll tax rule.

1927

- Nixon v. Herndon is heard by the Supreme Court, which rules that white primary laws are unconstitutional.

=== 1930s ===
1932

- Nixon v. Condon is heard by the Supreme Court which strikes down a Texas law to allow political parties to choose who can vote in their primary elections.

1933

- November 7: Pennsylvania passes a state constitutional amendment that removes the requirement of voters to be "taxpayers," however, a poll tax continued to be collected.

1935

- Grovey v. Townsend decides that the Democratic Party, as private organization, can determine who is allowed to join and therefore vote in the primaries.

1936

- Women in the United States Virgin Islands are granted the right to vote after a Federal court issues a mandamus to add women to the list of qualified voter registrants.

1937

- Breedlove v. Suttles was heard by the Supreme Court which decides that Georgia is allowed to impose a poll tax.

=== 1940s ===
1943

- Chinese immigrants are given the right to gain citizenship and thus the right to vote by the Magnuson Act.

1944

- The decision in Grovey v. Townsend is overturned by the case, Smith v. Allwright heard before the Supreme Court. It is decided that primary elections are an "integral component of the electoral process" and discrimination in participation in the primaries was prohibited.

1948

- Arizona and New Mexico are among the last states to extend full voting rights to Native Americans, which had been opposed by some western states in contravention of the Indian Citizenship Act of 1924.

=== 1950s ===
1951

- Butler v. Thompson is heard by the Supreme Court which rules that poll taxes are settled law that the state of Virginia is allowed to impose.

1952

- All Americans with Asian ancestry are allowed to vote through the McCarran Walter Act.

1954

- Native Americans living on reservations earn the right to vote in Maine.

1958

- The provision in the North Dakota state constitution that required Native Americans to renounce their tribal affiliations two years before an election is removed.

1959

- Alaska adopts a more lenient literacy test.

=== 1960s ===
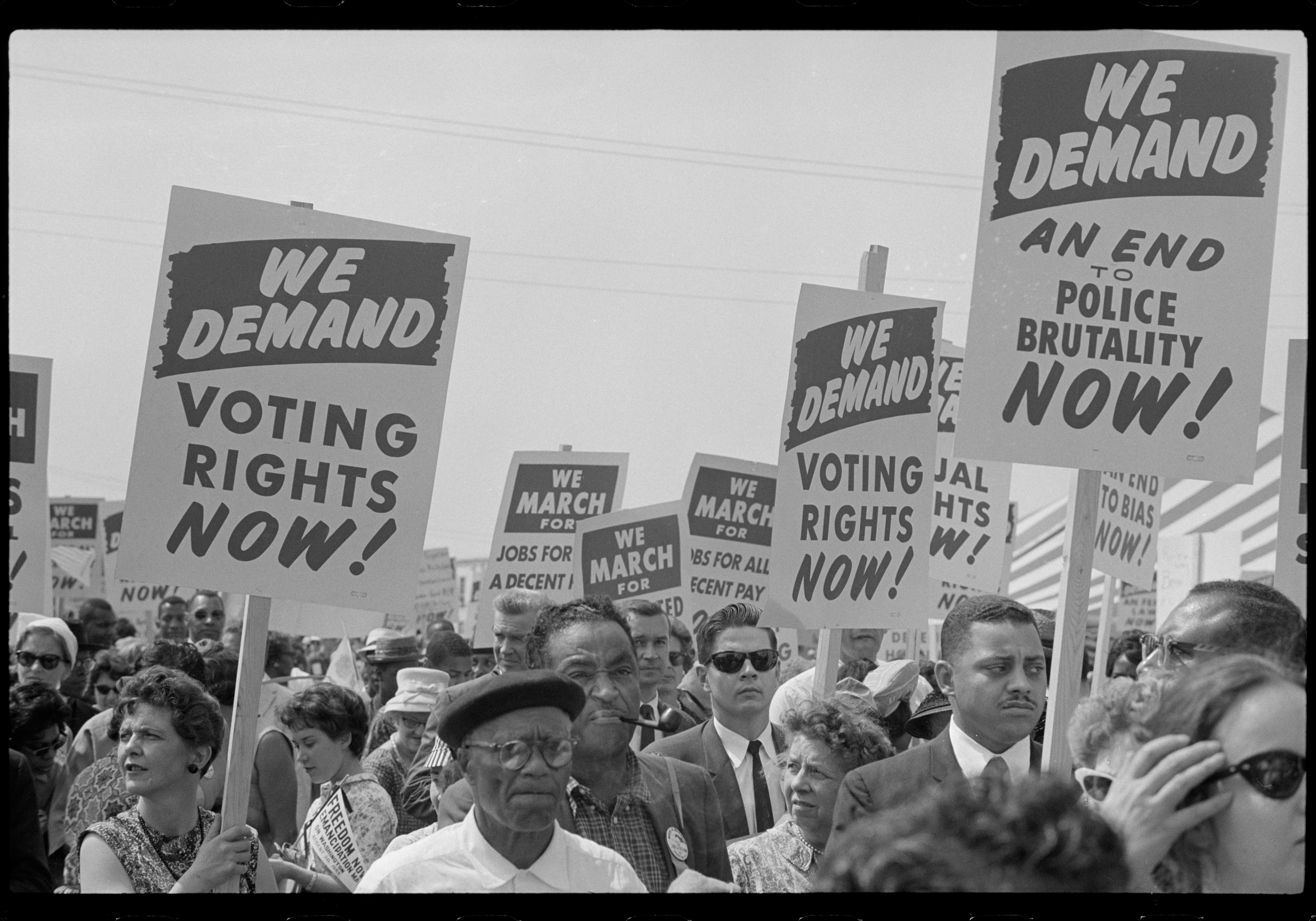
Marchers with signs at the March on Washington

1961

- Residents of Washington, D.C. are granted the right to vote in U.S. Presidential Elections by the Twenty-third Amendment to the United States Constitution.

1962–1964

- A historic turning point arrived after the U.S. Supreme Court under Chief Justice Earl Warren made a series of landmark decisions which helped establish the nationwide "one man, one vote" electoral system in the United States.
  - In March 1962, the Warren Court ruled in Baker v. Carr (1962) that redistricting qualifies as a justiciable question, thus enabling federal courts to hear redistricting cases.
  - In February 1964, the Warren Court ruled in Wesberry v. Sanders (1964) that districts in the United States House of Representatives must be approximately equal in population.
  - In June 1964, the Warren Court ruled in Reynolds v. Sims (1964) that each chamber of a bicameral state legislature must have electoral districts roughly equal in population.

1964

- Poll Tax payment prohibited from being used as a condition for voting in federal elections by the Twenty-fourth Amendment to the United States Constitution.

1965

- Protection of voter registration and voting for racial minorities, later applied to language minorities, is established by the Voting Rights Act of 1965. This has also been applied to correcting discriminatory election systems and districting.
- In Harman v. Forssenius the Supreme Court ruled that poll taxes or "equivalent or milder substitutes" cannot be imposed on voters.

1966

- Tax payment and wealth requirements for voting in state elections are prohibited by the Supreme Court in Harper v. Virginia Board of Elections. The poll tax would remain on the books, unenforceable, until 2020.

=== 1970s ===
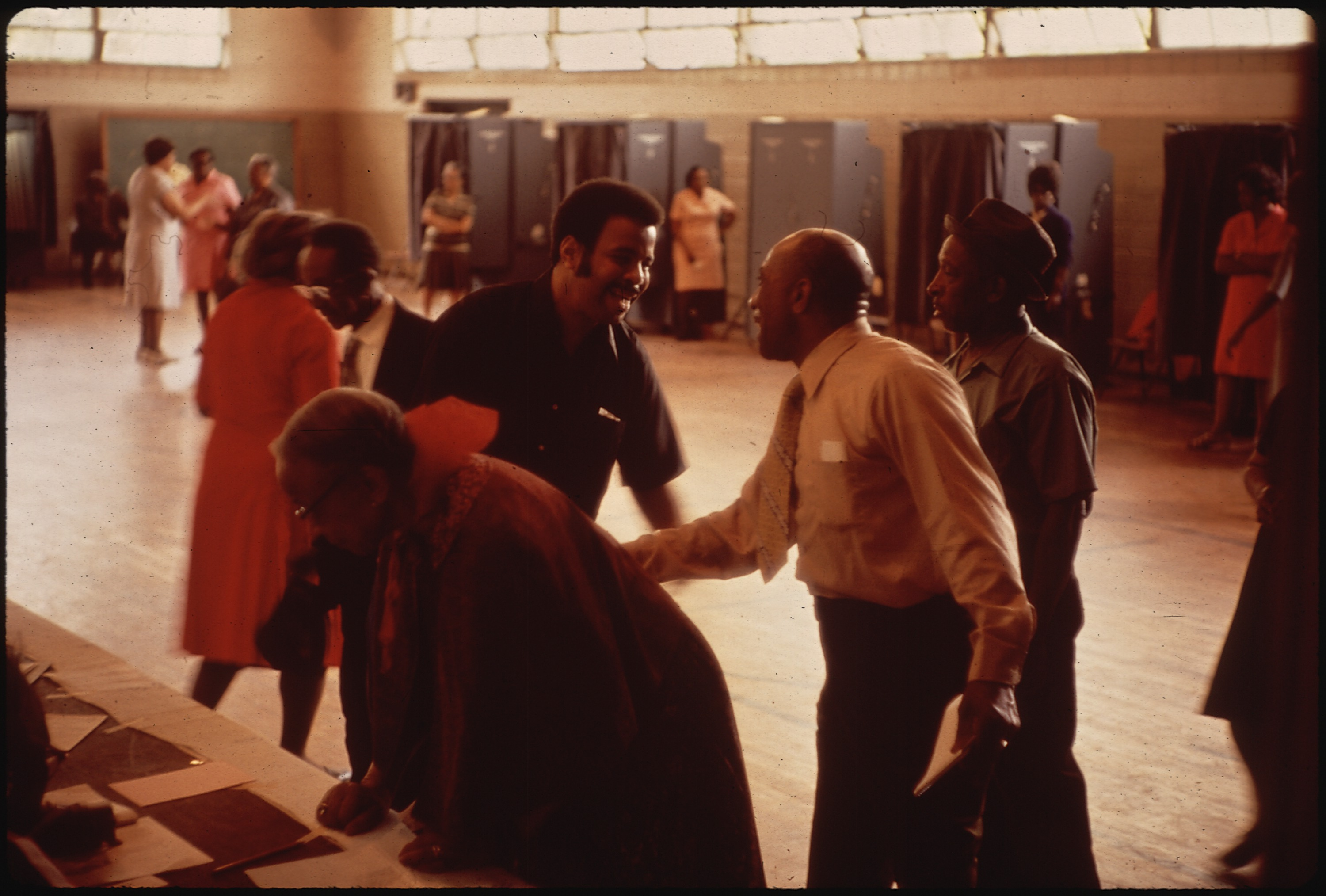
Voting in the 1972 Presidential Primary Election in Birmingham, Alabama

1970

- Alaska ends the use of literacy tests.
- Native Americans who live on reservations in Colorado are first allowed to vote in the state.

1971

- Adults aged 18 through 21 are granted the right to vote by the Twenty-sixth Amendment to the United States Constitution. This was enacted in response to Vietnam War protests, which argued that soldiers who were old enough to fight for their country should be granted the right to vote.

1972

- Requirement that a person reside in a jurisdiction for an extended period is prohibited by the Supreme Court in Dunn v. Blumstein, 405 U.S. 330 (1972).

1973

- Washington, D.C. local elections, such as Mayor and Councilmen, restored after a 100-year gap in Georgetown, and a 190-year gap in the wider city, ending Congress's policy of local election disfranchisement started in 1801 in this former portion of Maryland – see: D.C. Home rule.

1974

- A challenge to felony disenfranchisement, Richardson v. Ramirez is filed, though the Supreme Court upholds California's policies.
- O'Brien v. Skinner upholds the rights of some people who are incarcerated to vote without interference from the government.

1975

- The Voting Rights Act is modified to provide voters information in Native American languages and other non-English languages.

=== 1980s ===
1982

- A 25-year extension of the VRA is signed by President Ronald Reagan.

1983

- Texas repeals the lifelong prohibition against voters with felony convictions and institutes a five year waiting period after completing a sentence to vote.

1985

- Texas changes the five year waiting period to two years for people with felony convictions.

1986

- United States Military and Uniformed Services, Merchant Marine, other citizens overseas, living on bases in the United States, abroad, or aboard ship are granted the right to vote by the Uniformed and Overseas Citizens Absentee Voting Act.

=== 1990s ===
1993

- The National Voter Registration Act passes and is meant to make voter registration available in more locations.

1997

- Texas ends the two year waiting period for people with felony convictions to restore voting rights.

1998

- People in Utah with a felony conviction are prohibited from voting while serving their sentence. People with a felony conviction may vote after release from prison, if they were convicted in Utah. If they were convicted out of state, their rights are not restored due to the wording of the law.

== 2000s ==
2000

- Voters in United States territories, including American Samoa, Guam, Puerto Rico, and the United States Virgin Islands are ruled ineligible to vote in presidential elections.
- Delaware ends lifetime disenfranchisement for people with felony convictions for most offenses but institutes a five-year waiting period.

2001

- New Mexico ends lifetime disenfranchisement for people with a felony conviction.

2005

- Iowa restores the voting rights of felons who completed their prison sentences.
- Nebraska ends lifetime disenfranchisement of people with felonies but adds a five-year waiting period.

2006

- The Voting Rights Act of 1965 was extended for the fourth time by President George W. Bush, being the second extension of 25 years.
- Utah changes wording of their law and restores voting rights to all people who have completed their prison sentence for a felony.
- Rhode Island restores voting rights for people serving probation or parole for felonies.

2007

- Florida restores voting rights for most non-violent people with felony convictions.

2009

- Washington restores a person's right to vote if they have completed their sentences for a felony conviction.

=== 2010s ===
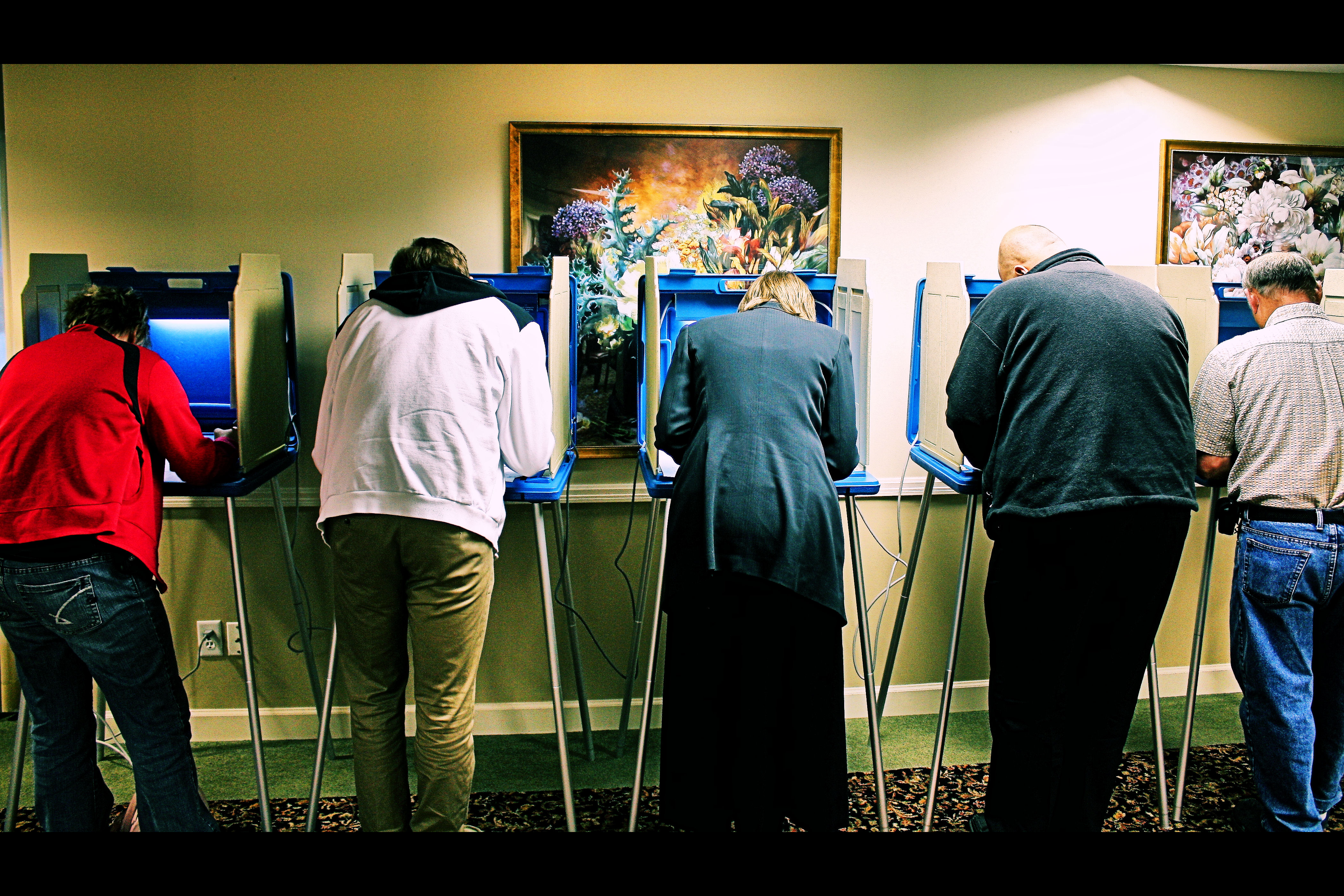
Voting on election day in Des Moines, Iowa, 2010

2010

- Voting rights in New Jersey are restored to individuals serving probation and parole for felonies.

2011

- Florida changes their felony voting rules; felons must wait five years after sentencing and apply for their right to vote again.
- Iowa reverses their rule allowing felons who have completed their sentences to vote.
- Texas passes one of the most restrictive voter ID laws in the country, but it is blocked by the courts.

2013

- Supreme Court ruled in the 5–4 Shelby County v. Holder decision that Section 4(b) of the Voting Rights Act is unconstitutional. Section 4(b) stated that if states or local governments want to change their voting laws, they must appeal to the Attorney General.
- Delaware waives the five-year waiting period for voters with a felony conviction.
- North Dakota passes House Bill 1332 which was targeted at restricting Native American voters. Any voter without a permanent address is no longer eligible to vote.

2016

- California allows prisoners in county jail to vote.
- Maryland restores voting rights to felons after they have served their term in prison.

2017

- Alabama publishes a list of crimes that can lead to disqualification of the right to vote.
- Wyoming restores the voting rights of non-violent felons.

2018

- The residential address law in North Dakota is upheld by the United States Supreme Court.
- Florida voting rights for people with a felony conviction is restored with some additional requirements needed in some cases.
- People with a felony conviction in Louisiana who have not been incarcerated for five years (inclusive of probation or parole) are able to vote.
- New York allows parolees to vote.

2019

- People convicted of a felony may vote in Nevada after release from prison.
- Citizens on parole may vote in Colorado.
- People convicted of a felony may vote in Oklahoma after serving their full sentence, including parole and other types of probation.

=== 2020s ===
2020

- California restores voting rights to citizens serving parole.
- Washington, D.C. passes a law to allow incarcerated felons to vote.
- People with a felony conviction have their right to vote in Iowa restored with some restrictions and each potential voter must have completed their sentence.
- People with a felony conviction in New Jersey can vote after release from prison; citizens on parole or probation can also vote.
- North Dakota reaches an agreement with the Spirit Lake Nation and the Standing Rock Sioux to recognize tribal address as valid for voting purposes.

2021

- The Supreme Court's ruling on Brnovich v. Democratic National Committee removes most remaining sections of the Voting Rights Act, except for redistricting rules and bans of egregious discrimination.
- Texas enacts sweeping legislation that further tightens state election laws and constrains local control of elections by limiting counties’ ability to expand voting options.

== See also ==
- Ballot access
- Civil Rights Act of 1960
- Felony disenfranchisement in the United States
- List of suffragists and suffragettes
- Lodge Bill
- Timeline of women's suffrage in the United States
- Women's poll tax repeal movement
- Women's suffrage in the United States
