= Williams v. Lee =

- Supreme Court of the United States

Argued November 20, 1958 Decided January 12, 1959
- Full case name: Williams et ux. v. Lee, doing business as Ganado Trading Post
- Citations: 358 U.S. 217 (more) 79 S. Ct. 269; 3 L. Ed. 2d 251; 1959 U.S. LEXIS 1656

Case history
- Prior: Williams et ux. v. Lee, 319 P.2d 998 (Ariz. 1958).

Holding
- The state of Arizona does not have jurisdiction to try a civil case between a non-Indian doing business on a reservation with tribal members who reside on the reservation, the proper forum for such a case being the tribal court.

Court membership
- Chief Justice Earl Warren Associate Justices Hugo Black · Felix Frankfurter; William O. Douglas · Tom C. Clark; John M. Harlan II · William J. Brennan Jr. Charles E. Whittaker · Potter Stewart

Case opinion
- Majority: Black, joined unanimously

Laws applied
- U.S. Const. art. I, § 8, cl. 3

Williams v. Lee, 358 U.S. 217 (1959), was a landmark case in which the Supreme Court of the United States held that the State of Arizona does not have jurisdiction to try a civil case between a non-Indian doing business on a reservation with tribal members who reside on the reservation, the proper forum for such cases being the tribal court.

The Navajo tribe has lived in the southwestern United States and first came into contact with the United States government in 1846, signing a treaty with the government in 1849. In the early 1860s, the government removed the tribe from their traditional area to eastern New Mexico at the Bosque Redondo. In 1868, the United States and the tribe signed a new treaty to put it back on a reservation in their traditional lands, where the tribe focused on raising sheep and goats.

== Background ==
=== History of the tribe ===
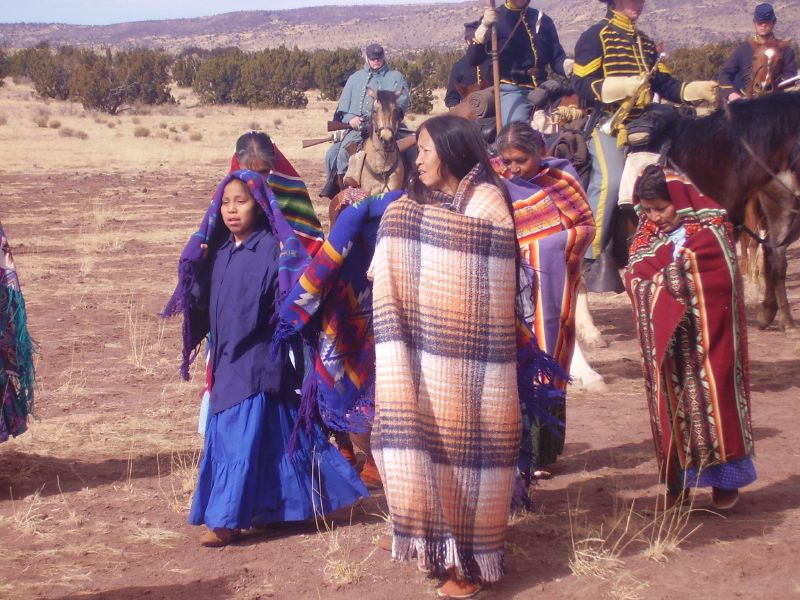
Reenactment of the Long Walk

The Navajo tribe came into contact with the United States in 1846 after General Stephen W. Kearney marched to Santa Fe during the Mexican–American War. The tribe signed its first treaty with the United States in 1849, and signed another treaty in 1868. The 1849 treaty was immediately suspect among tribal members because of the actions of Colonel John Macrae Washington that resulted in the death of Navajo leader Narbona. (Note: The incident started when Col. Washington ordered a Navajo off of a horse and the Navajo refused. Washington ordered his troops to open fire, and seven Navajos, including Narbona, were slain, shot in the back as they were leaving.) With relations strained, in 1862 the United States began a military campaign under Kit Carson to remove the tribe from the mountains of Arizona (Note: At the same time, Carson had his men destroy the tribe's means of survival, from cutting down peach orchards to killing sheep and other livestock.) to the Bosque Redondo on the Pecos River near present-day Fort Sumner, New Mexico, which resulted in the Long Walk of the Navajo, removing the tribe from their home and relocating them to eastern New Mexico. The 1868 treaty was signed at Fort Sumner and provided for the tribe's return to the current reservation and traditional homeland, (Note: The Navajo's traditional homeland was defined by four mountain peaks, La Plata Mountain, Mount Blanca, Mount Taylor, and the San Francisco Peaks, which were viewed as sacred by the tribe.) but also for 15,000 head of sheep and goats and 500 cattle to be provided to the tribe by the U.S. government. (Note: At one time, the Navajo were believed to possess about 500,000 sheep, 30,000 cattle, and 10,000 horses and mules. By the time of the 1868 treaty, the tribe only had "940 sheep, 1,025 goats, and 1,550 horses....") Unlike many other treaties, it was celebrated by the Navajo as preserving the majority of their land for the tribe.

=== Reservation ===
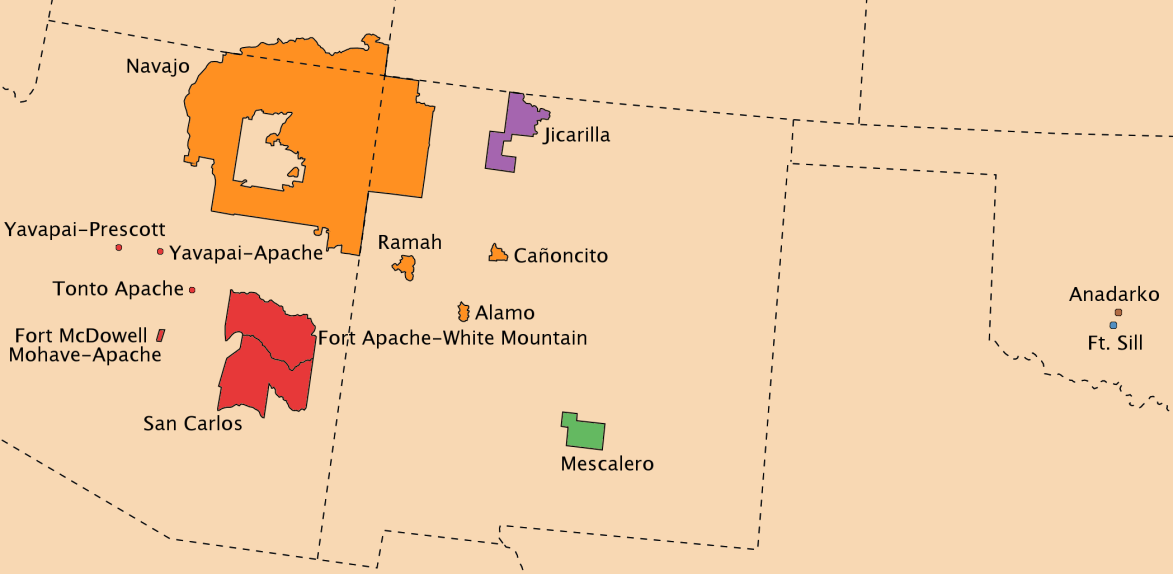
Map of the Navajo reservation (in orange)

The Navajo reservation was originally established in eastern Arizona / western New Mexico. Although the tribe was promised 10,000 square miles (6,400,000 acres), the tribe actually received 5,285 square miles (3,382,302 acres). Unlike most other reservations, the Navajo reservation actually expanded over the following years. Presidential executive orders added significant land to the reservation beginning in 1878 and running through 1901. By 1934 and the last Congressional adjustment, the reservation contained 27,425 square miles (17,552,000 acres). At the same time the tribe was increasing its land, it was increasing the quantity of livestock, particularly sheep. In the 1930s, the Bureau of Indian Affairs (BIA) estimated that the reservation supported 575,000 sheep and 186,000 goats. The livestock was overgrazing the land, and the experts estimated that the land could support only half the number that was being grazed. The BIA then began an aggressive stock reduction program that reminded many Navajo of the imprisonment at the Bosque Redondo and was opposed by the tribe.

At the same time, the Navajo began to develop a more detailed system of self-government, including a court system. In 1949, Congress passed the Navajo-Hopi Rehabilitation bill; its Fernandez Amendment which would have granted the states jurisdiction over tribal lands. President Harry S. Truman vetoed the bill and requested Congress to send it back to him without the Fernandez Amendment, which it did the following year.

=== Indian traders ===
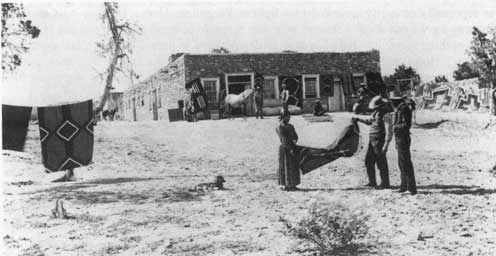
Navajo trading post in the 1890s

The first licensed trading with the Navajo began in 1849, and Auguste Lacome was the first trader recorded. After the return from the Bosque Redondo, Army sutlers at the military posts such as Fort Defiance, Arizona began to trade extra rations for Navajo wool. By 1883, traders were buying 1.3 million pounds of wool in addition to other products raised or produced by the tribe The traders, who were largely Mormon, often pushed for maximum immediate production rather than a long-term sustainable yield. About 1885, the traders began to transform from a barter economy to a credit system. The traders had a monopoly and created a virtual system of debt bondage by being the only ones to offer credit for goods needed by tribal members. However, after 1890, the US government prohibited traders collecting for old debts and require them to use cash instead of trader script or "tin" money.

Part of that was due to the nature of the trading system, where the trader could not own their own store or land, which had to be leased from the Navajo. In addition to the restriction on land, the trader had to post a $10,000 bond with the BIA. Long-term traders, such as John Lorenzo Hubbell or William Keams, established relationships with tribal members to foster long-term repeat business. They began to market Navajo blankets for use in mining camps and as area rugs in the eastern United States. By 1943, there were over 140 trading posts on the reservation.

=== Credit dispute ===
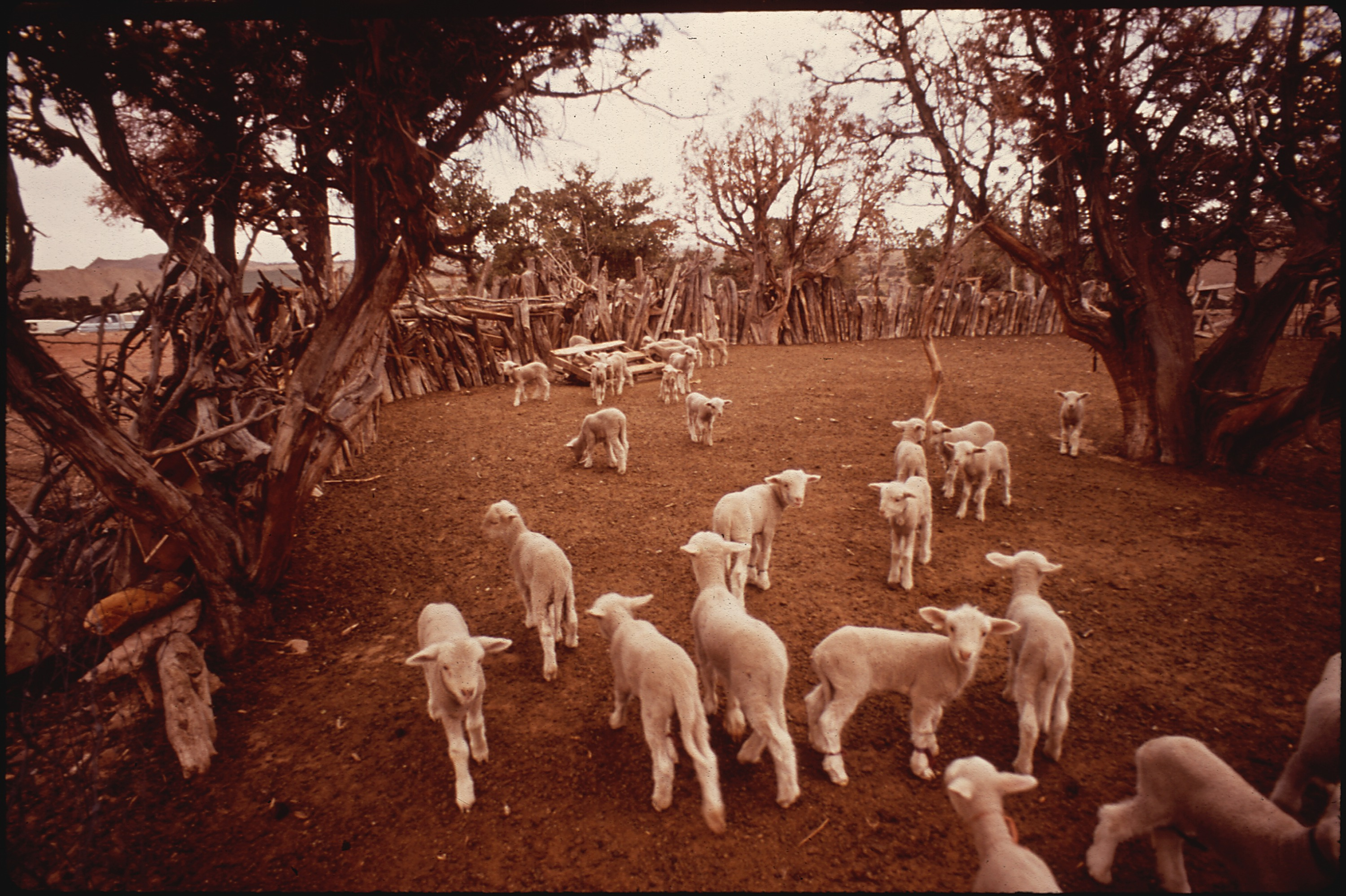
Navajo sheep on reservation

Hugh Lee was an Indian trader who operated a trading post on the reservation. Lee was licensed by the BIA to operate the trading post and he sold goods on credit to members of the tribe. Paul Williams and his wife, Lorena, were enrolled tribal members of the Navajo tribe and resided on the Navajo reservation. Williams bought goods on credit and did not make payment. In 1952, Lee filed a lawsuit in the Superior Court of Apache County, Arizona and obtained a writ of attachment for sheep belonging to Williams. (Note: Sheep were the primary livelihood for Williams and for most members of the Navajo tribe)

==== State court ====
Williams moved to dismiss the case, arguing that the state court did not have jurisdiction on the reservation. In the meantime, Lee was granted an order authorizing the Apache County Sheriff to sell at auction the sheep belonging to Williams. In 1954, the trial court finally issued a ruling denying the motion to dismiss and in 1955, it found for Lee. Williams appealed to the Arizona Supreme Court.

==== Arizona Supreme Court ====
At the Arizona Supreme Court, Williams argued that the proper jurisdiction was the Navajo tribal court and that a state officer did not have the authority to sell the sheep. The court held that the state had jurisdiction to hear civil cases involving Indians and non-Indians since there was no Congressional prohibition against it. The court ruled, however, that federal regulations prohibited the sale of Indian livestock without the approval of BIA. Williams then appealed to the United States Supreme Court, which agreed to hear the case and issued a writ of certiorari.

== Supreme Court ==
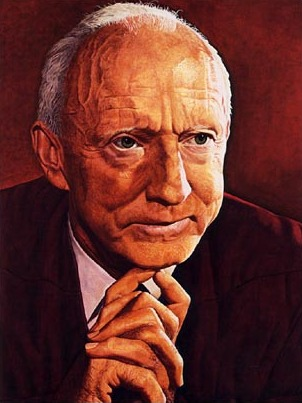
Justice Hugo Black, author of the unanimous opinion

=== Arguments ===
Norman M. Littell (Note: Littell was the attorney for the Navajo tribe, who funded the appeal to the Supreme Court. The tribe was concerned that if the Arizona Supreme Court decision stood, the state would undermine the authority of the tribe to govern itself.) argued the case for Williams. Littell argued that Congress had plenary power to end tribal immunity but had not done so, and other federal laws preempted state jurisdiction.

William W. Stevenson argued the case for Lee. He argued that the Navajo tribe was a creation of the federal government and not a longstanding tribe, like the Cherokee. His position was that there was no tribal sovereignty. Solicitor General J. Lee Rankin filed an amicus curae brief at the request of the court, urging reversal. While Rankin supported reversal, he did so on narrow grounds, based on federal regulations of Indian traders.

=== Decision ===
Justice Hugo Black delivered the opinion of a unanimous court. He noted that in 1830, the state of Georgia had tried to extend its laws to the Cherokee reservation and that Worcester v. Georgia clearly established that state law and jurisprudence did not reach into the confines of a reservation. (Note: Black quoted Chief Justice John Marshall, who stated "The Cherokee nation... is a distinct community, occupying its own territory... in which the laws of Georgia can have no force, and which the citizens of Georgia have no right to enter, but with the assent of the Cherokees themselves, or in conformity with treaties, and with the acts of congress. The whole intercourse between the United States and this nation, is, by our constitution and laws, vested in the government of the United States.") He then stated that the question was whether, absent Congressional authorization, a state infringed on the right of the tribe to govern itself. The Navajo-Hopi Rehabilitation Act was designed by Congress to strengthen the tribal government and tribal courts. (Note: Coincidentally, the same year that this case was decided, the Navajo Nation took control of its tribal courts back from the federal government.) Black observed, "Significantly, when Congress has wished the States to exercise this power it has expressly granted them the jurisdiction which Worcester v. Georgia had denied." Finally, he noted that the Navajo tribal court has jurisdiction to hear civil cases brought by non-Indians against tribal members and that no federal statute gave Arizona jurisdiction to hear such cases. (Note: Black noted that Public Law 280 would grant Arizona such authority, but Arizona had not moved to accept such jurisdiction.)

Black stated that allowing the exercise of state jurisdiction would undermine tribal sovereignty and that only Congress had the authority to do so. The case was reversed.

== Subsequent developments ==
Williams has been cited as the initial case in the modern era of federal Indian law. It is widely cited in cases dealing with tribal sovereignty and state infringement on tribal rights. Some claim that Williams formed the basis for the Indian self-determination era and for the Indian Self-Determination Act. The case was also the first of a series of cases that limited Arizona's authority within the Navajo reservation. (Note: The other cases were Warren Trading Post Co. v. Arizona Tax Comm'n and McClanahan v. Arizona State Tax Comm'n) The case is considered a landmark case involving tribal sovereignty.
