= Joseph A. Jordan Jr. =

American judge

Joseph A. Jordan Jr. (1923 - 14 June 1991) was an African American lawyer and civil rights activist. He worked as a lawyer and judge and was part of the lawsuit heard before the Supreme Court of the United States that ended poll taxes.

== Early life and education ==
Jordan was raised in Norfolk, Virginia. He went to the Booker T. Washington High School and went on to the Virginia Union University. In 1943, he went into the United States Army and fought overseas with the 846 Gas Company and the 67th Infantry during World War II. In September 1945, he was injured when his jeep slid off of the highway into a mine field. The accident caused him to become paralyzed from the waist down so Jordan used a wheelchair. Jordan went on to earn a degree in sociology. He earned his law degree from Brooklyn Law School. Later, he studied labor law at New York University.

== Career ==
=== Legal activities ===
In 1954, he set up a law practice in Norfolk. In 1955, when the state of Virginia planned to create a referendum to allow segregation, Jordan filed an injunction to block the vote. When Jordan and another civil rights activist, Evelyn Thomas Butts, were restrained from picketing a supermarket for not hiring black people in high level jobs, Jordan fought the restraining order, but lost. Jordan was involved in several anti-segregation cases in 1961, 1962 and 1964 in Virginia. In November 1963, Butts hired him to sue the state for requiring a poll tax to vote. The case was dismissed by the 4th Circuit Court of Appeals in 1964. In May 1964, Jordan and Butts filed another suit which accused the state of violating four amendments of the Constitution with the poll tax. Butts' case against the poll tax was appealed to the Supreme Court of the United States and was bundled with another case, Harper v. Virginia State Board of Elections in 1966.

When the case went before the Supreme Court, Jordan argued that the poll tax laws had successfully barred black people not only from voting, but from holding office. Jordan said, "Almost like a magic wand after the passage of this law, these poll tax laws, not a single Negro has sat in the Virginia General Assembly, and not a single Negro has held a single elected state office in the state of Virginia." The decision was made by the Supreme Court in two months and they decided that the poll tax or voting fee did violate the Equal Protection Clause of the 14th Amendment.

=== Political career ===
In 1968, Jordan was elected to the Norfolk City Council and became the first black person to hold the seat since 1889. In 1971, Jordan was the only black member of the city council. In 1972, he became the vice-mayor of Norfolk. In 1974, Jordan resigned as vice-mayor in protest, "saying the city is being run by the Norfolk Redevelopment Authority rather than City Council."

Jordan was appointed to the General District Court on July 1, 1977. He was one of only a few African American state judges at the time. He retired from this position in 1986.

== Death ==
Jordan died at the Veterans Administration Hospital in Hampton on June 14, 1991. A public library in Norfolk is named after Jordan. A foundation in his name, the Joe Jordan Foundation, raised funds in his name to build the Martin Luther King Jr. memorial in Norfolk. The memorial was dedicated in 2000 and had been proposed in the 1970s by Jordan.
