= Harper v. Virginia State Board of Elections =

- Supreme Court of the United States

Argued January 6–26, 1966 Decided March 24, 1966
- Full case name: Annie E. Harper, et al. v. Virginia State Board of Elections, et al.
- Citations: 383 U.S. 663 (more) 86 S. Ct. 1079; 16 L. Ed. 2d 169; 1966 U.S. LEXIS 2905

Case history
- Prior: 240 F. Supp. 270 (E.D. Va. 1964); probable jurisdiction noted, 380 U.S. 930 (1965).

Holding
- Laws which specify Jim Crow Laws requirements to vote in elections violate the Equal Protection Clause of the Fourteenth Amendment to the Constitution of the United States of America.

Court membership
- Chief Justice Earl Warren Associate Justices Hugo Black · William O. Douglas; Tom C. Clark · John M. Harlan II; William J. Brennan Jr. · Potter Stewart; Byron White · Abe Fortas

Case opinions
- Majority: Douglas, joined by Warren, Clark, Brennan, White, Fortas
- Dissent: Black
- Dissent: Harlan, joined by Stewart

Laws applied
- U.S. Const. amend. XIV
- This case overturned a previous ruling or rulings
- Breedlove v. Suttles (1937)

Harper v. Virginia State Board of Elections, 383 U.S. 663 (1966), was a case in which the United States Supreme Court found that Virginia's poll tax was unconstitutional under the Equal Protection Clause of the Fourteenth Amendment. In the late 19th and early 20th centuries, eleven southern states established poll taxes as part of their disenfranchisement of most blacks and many poor whites. The Twenty-fourth Amendment to the United States Constitution (1964) prohibited poll taxes in federal elections; five states (Alabama, Arkansas, Mississippi, Texas, and Virginia) continued to require poll taxes for voters in state elections. By this ruling, the Supreme Court banned the use of poll taxes in state elections.

== Background ==
The case was filed by Virginia resident Annie E. Harper, who was unable to register without having to pay a poll tax. She brought the suit against the Virginia State Board of Elections on behalf of other poor residents and herself. Harper had previously argued the case before a U.S. district court on October 21, 1964, where it was consolidated with a similar case filed by Evelyn Thomas Butts, Butts v. Harrison, Governor of Virginia and argued under the name Harper v. Virginia State Board of Elections. In the initial case lawyers for Harper and Butts argued against the constitutionality of the poll tax, but on November 12 the courts dismissed the case, citing 1930s precedents established by the United States Supreme Court.

Harper quickly appealed this decision to the Supreme Court, but in a separate case from Butts. Butts later appealed in a separate suit, but the two cases were argued together during late January 1966.

== Decision ==
In a 6 to 3 vote, the Court ruled in favor of Ms. Harper. The Court noted that "a state violates the Equal Protection Clause of the Fourteenth Amendment to the U.S. Constitution whenever it makes the affluence of the voter or payment of any fee an electoral standard. Voter qualifications have no relation to wealth."

This ruling reversed a prior decision by the Court, Breedlove v. Suttles, 302 U.S. 277 (1937), which upheld the state's ability to impose poll taxes as within its powers. There had been no relevant change in the text of the Constitution between 1937 and 1966. The 24th Amendment, adopted in 1964, outlawed the poll tax in federal elections, but did not speak to the question of state elections, which was the question involved in the Harper case. The Court membership had changed, and the justices examined the issue from a different point of view.

== Dissents ==
Joined by Justice Potter Stewart, Justice John Marshall Harlan II dissented, arguing that the Court had allowed some forms of discriminatory voting qualifications without violating the equal protection clause, e.g., Lassiter v. Northampton County Board of Elections (literacy test), Breedlove v. Suttles (poll tax on men), as long as it was rational. In this case, Virginia's poll tax could be deemed rational because of the state's desire to collect revenue and the belief that people who pay to vote might have more interest in the state's policies.

Justice Hugo Black filed a separate dissent. Black based his dissent mainly on stare decisis basis. As a textualist, he also criticized the majority for expanding the meaning of the Fourteenth Amendment by using what he called the old "natural law due process formula". He emphasized that new meanings can be added to the Constitution only through amendments.

== See also ==
- List of United States Supreme Court cases, volume 383
- Joseph A. Jordan Jr.
