= American Ship Building Co. v. NLRB =

- Supreme Court of the United States

Argued January 21, 1965 Decided March 29, 1965
- Full case name: American Ship Building Company v. National Labor Relations Board
- Citations: 380 U.S. 300 (more)

Holding
- Lockouts are not considered unfair labor practices under the National Labor Relations Act of 1935.

Court membership
- Chief Justice Earl Warren Associate Justices Hugo Black · William O. Douglas; Tom C. Clark · John M. Harlan II; William J. Brennan Jr. · Potter Stewart; Byron White · Arthur Goldberg

Case opinions
- Majority: Stewart, joined by unanimous
- Concurrence: White (in judgment)
- Concurrence: Goldberg (in judgment), joined by Warren

Laws applied
- National Labor Relations Act of 1935

American Ship Building Company v. National Labor Relations Board, 380 U.S. 300 (1965), was a United States Supreme Court case in which the court held that lockouts are not considered unfair labor practices under the National Labor Relations Act of 1935.

== Background ==
The American Ship Building Company operated four shipyards on the Great Lakes, primarily engaged in repairing cargo vessels. Because ship repairs were highly seasonal and dependent on the winter freeze when vessels were idle, the company's business was heavily concentrated during winter months.

During contract negotiations with eight unions representing its employees in the summer of 1961, the parties reached an impasse. Fearing that the unions would delay calling a strike until the busy winter repair season when a work stoppage would cause severe economic disruption the company temporarily closed its yards and laid off its workers.

The unions filed unfair labor practice charges with the National Labor Relations Board (NLRB), alleging that the lockout violated Sections 8(a)(1) and 8(a)(3) of the National Labor Relations Act of 1935 (NLRA). The NLRB ruled against the company, holding that bargaining lockouts were inherently illegal unless used defensively to prevent imminent property damage. The United States Court of Appeals for the District of Columbia Circuit affirmed the NLRB's decision, and the Supreme Court granted certiorari to decide whether an employer could lawfully use a lockout as an offensive bargaining weapon.

== Opinion of the court ==
On March 29, 1965, the Supreme Court ruled unanimously in favor of the American Ship Building Company, reversing the decision of the D.C. Circuit.

Justice Potter Stewart delivered the opinion of the Court. The Court held that an employer does not violate Sections 8(a)(1) or 8(a)(3) of the NLRA merely by locking out employees after reaching a bargaining impasse to exert economic pressure in support of a legitimate bargaining position. Justice Stewart noted that the NLRA does not give the NLRB authority to act as an arbiter of economic power between employers and unions. The opinion emphasized that a lockout does not inherently demonstrate anti-union animus, nor does it interfere with workers' statutory rights to bargain collectively or strike.

Justice Byron White filed an opinion concurring in the judgment, arguing that the decision should have focused narrowly on the employer's reasonable fear of a strike during peak season rather than establishing a broader rule.

Justice Arthur Goldberg, joined by Chief Justice Earl Warren, also concurred in the judgment, expressing concern that the majority's holding created an overly broad rule authorizing offensive lockouts.

The Supreme Court issued an opinion on March 29, 1965.

== Subsequent developments ==
American Ship Building Co. v. NLRB fundamentally reshaped American labor law by legitimizing the "offensive" bargaining lockout as a legal economic weapon for employers. Decided alongside its companion case, NLRB v. Brown, 380 U.S. 278 (1965), the decision shifted the balance of labor negotiations by establishing that lockouts are a direct counterpart to a union's right to strike once bargaining reaches a genuine impasse.

Following the ruling, the National Labor Relations Board (NLRB) gradually clarified the scope of legal lockouts in subsequent decisions. In Harrah's Lake Tahoe Casino (1992) and Darling & Co. (1968), the Board extended the principle, confirming that lockouts initiated prior to an impasse may also be lawful if supported by a legitimate business justification and free of anti-union animus.

The decision remains a core precedent in labor law, cited repeatedly by federal courts and legal scholars to define the boundaries of employer leverage and protected economic self-help under the NLRA.
