= Louisiana v. United States (1965) =

- Supreme Court of the United States

Argued January 26, 1965 Decided March 8, 1965
- Full case name: Louisiana et al. v. United States
- Citations: 380 U.S. 145 (more) 85 S. Ct. 817; 13 L. Ed. 2d 709

Case history
- Prior: United States v. Louisiana, 225 F. Supp. 353 (E.D. La. 1963); probable jurisdiction noted, 377 U.S. 987 (1964).

Court membership
- Chief Justice Earl Warren Associate Justices Hugo Black · William O. Douglas; Tom C. Clark · John M. Harlan II; William J. Brennan Jr. · Potter Stewart; Byron White · Arthur Goldberg

Case opinions
- Majority: Black, joined by Warren, Douglas, Clark, Brennan, Stewart, White, Goldberg
- Concurrence: Harlan

Louisiana v. United States, 380 U.S. 145 (1965), was a case decided by the Supreme Court of the United States that dealt with an "interpretation test" permitted by the Louisiana Constitution of 1921 alleged to deprive Louisiana Negroes of voting rights in violation of 42 U.S.C. Section 1971(a) and the Fourteenth and Fifteenth Amendments.

The test gave complete discretion to registrars to deny an applicant the ability to register to vote if he could not "give a reasonable interpretation" of any clause in the Louisiana Constitution or the Constitution of the United States.

== See also ==
- List of United States Supreme Court cases, volume 380
