= FTC v. Consolidated Foods Corp. =

- Supreme Court of the United States

Decided April 28, 1965
- Full case name: FTC v. Consolidated Foods Corp.
- Citations: 380 U.S. 592 (more)

Holding
- A court may consider post-acquisition evidence of the effect of a merger upon market competition when determining whether a merger violated antitrust law, but that consideration must not be conclusive on its own.

Court membership
- Chief Justice Earl Warren Associate Justices Hugo Black · William O. Douglas; Tom C. Clark · John M. Harlan II; William J. Brennan Jr. · Potter Stewart; Byron White · Arthur Goldberg

Case opinion
- Majority: Douglass

Laws applied
- Clayton Antitrust Act of 1914

FTC v. Consolidated Foods Corp., 380 U.S. 592 (1965), was a United States Supreme Court case in which the Court held that a court may consider post-acquisition evidence of the effect of a merger upon market competition when determining whether a merger violated antitrust law, but that consideration must not be conclusive on its own.
