= Armstrong v. Manzo =

- Supreme Court of the United States

Decided April 27, 1965
- Full case name: Armstrong v. Manzo
- Citations: 380 U.S. 545 (more)

Holding
- Failure to provide notice of pending adoption proceedings to the adversely situated biological parent is a violation of due process.

Court membership
- Chief Justice Earl Warren Associate Justices Hugo Black · William O. Douglas; Tom C. Clark · John M. Harlan II; William J. Brennan Jr. · Potter Stewart; Byron White · Arthur Goldberg

Case opinion
- Majority: Stewart, joined by unanimous

Laws applied
- Due Process Clause

Armstrong v. Manzo, 380 U.S. 545 (1965), was a United States Supreme Court case in which the court held that failure to provide notice of pending adoption proceedings to the adversely situated biological parent is a violation of due process.

== Significance ==
This case stands for the proposition that hearings in courts "must be granted at a meaningful time and in a meaningful manner."
