= Textile Workers v. Darlington Manufacturing Co. =

- Supreme Court of the United States

Argued December 9–10, 1964 Decided March 29, 1965
- Full case name: Textile Workers Union of America v. Darlington Manufacturing Company, et al.
- Citations: 380 U.S. 263 (more) 85 S. Ct. 994; 13 L. Ed. 2d 827

Case history
- Prior: Darlington Mfg. Co. v. NLRB, 325 F.2d 682 (4th Cir. 1963); cert. granted, 377 U.S. 903 (1964).

Holding
- "It is not an unfair labor practice for an employer to close his entire business, even if the closing is due to antiunion animus."

Court membership
- Chief Justice Earl Warren Associate Justices Hugo Black · William O. Douglas; Tom C. Clark · John M. Harlan II; William J. Brennan Jr. · Potter Stewart; Byron White · Arthur Goldberg

Case opinion
- Majority: Harlan, joined by Warren, Black, Douglas, Clark, Brennan, White
- Stewart and Goldberg took no part in the consideration or decision of the case.

Textile Workers v. Darlington Manufacturing Co., 380 U.S. 263 (1965), was a United States Supreme Court case in which the Court held:

1. It is not an unfair labor practice for an employer to close his entire business, even if the closing is due to anti-union animus. Pp. 380 U. S. 269-274.

2. Closing part of a business is an unfair labor practice under § 8(a)(3) of the Act if the purpose is to discourage unionism in any of the employer's remaining plants and if the employer may reasonably have foreseen such effect. Pp. 380 U. S. 274-275.

3. If those exercising control over a plant that is being closed for anti-union reasons have an interest in another business, whether or not affiliated with or in the same line of commerce as the closed plant, of sufficient substantiality to promise a benefit from nonunionization of that business, act to close their plant for that purpose, and have a relationship to the other business which makes it probable that its employees will fear closing down if organizational activities are continued, an unfair labor practice has been made out. Pp. 380 U. S. 275-276.

4. Since no findings were made by the Board as to the purpose and effect of the Darlington closing with respect to the employees of the other plants in the Deering Milliken group, the judgments are vacated and the cases remanded to permit such findings to be made. Pp. 380 U. S. 276-277.

== Opinion of the Court ==
Associate Justice John M. Harlan II authored the opinion of the Court.
