= FTC v. Colgate-Palmolive Co. =

Federal Trade Commission v. Colgate-Palmolive Company
- Supreme Court of the United States

Argued December 10, 1964 Decided April 5th, 1965
- Full case name: Federal Trade Commission v. Colgate-Palmolive Company
- Citations: 380 U.S. 374 (more) 85 S. Ct. 1035; 13 L. Ed. 2d 904; 1965 U.S. LEXIS 2300

Court membership
- Chief Justice Earl Warren Associate Justices Hugo Black · William O. Douglas; Tom C. Clark · John M. Harlan II; William J. Brennan Jr. · Potter Stewart; Byron White · Arthur Goldberg

Case opinions
- Majority: Warren, joined by Black, Douglas, Clark, Brennan, White, Goldberg
- Concur/dissent: Harlan, joined by Stewart

Federal Trade Commission v. Colgate-Palmolive Company, 380 U.S. 374 (1965), was a United States Supreme Court case.

== Background ==
A Colgate-Palmolive advertisement claimed that its Palmolive Rapid Shave shaving cream was so good it could be used to shave sandpaper. The commercial showed sandpaper applied with shaving cream and then shaved.

The Federal Trade Commission (FTC) complained that the ad was deceptive and a material misrepresentation because it was not sandpaper but rather sand sprinkled on glass. Colgate-Palmolive argued that the product really could shave sandpaper if left on long enough. Colgate-Palmolive sued arguing that the FTC had overstepped its authority.

== Opinion of the Court ==
The Supreme Court agreed with the FTC that the commercial was a material misrepresentation. The ruling forced advertisers to remain truthful in their product presentations. As a result, commercials often feature "dramatization" disclaimers.
