= Evelyn Thomas Butts =

American activist and politician

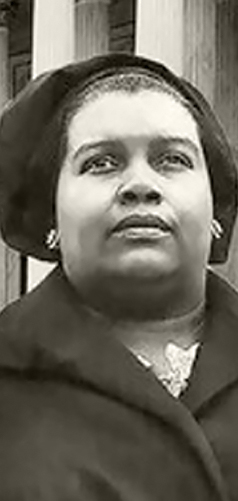
- Butts, 1966
- Born: Evelyn Thomas; May 22, 1924; Norfolk, Virginia
- Died: March 11, 1993 (aged 68); Norfolk, Virginia
- Known for: civil rights activist, politician

Evelyn Thomas Butts (May 22, 1924 - March 11, 1993) was an African American civil rights activist and politician in Virginia. She is best known for challenging the poll tax and took her case before the United States Supreme Court. Butts was part of the civil rights movement and later became an influential figure in Norfolk politics.

== Early life ==
Evelyn Thomas was born May 22, 1924, in Norfolk, Virginia. When she was ten years old, her mother, Lottie Cornick Thomas, died and she was adopted and raised by a politically active aunt. She married Charles Herbert Butts in 1941 and her husband served in World War II. The couple had three daughters together. When Charles retired due to a war-injury, Butts worked as a seamstress and took in boarders to make money. The Butts family moved to the Oakwood neighborhood of Norfolk and Butts became the president of the neighborhood's civic league.

== Civil rights activism ==
Butts became involved in the civil rights movement in the 1950s. During her time as the Oakwood Civic League, she helped create the Rosemont Middle School in her neighborhood so that children would not have to ride the bus to the segregated school. In 1960, she was involved in picketing the Be-Lo Supermarket for not employing black people in higher-level positions. She also protested against black people being told to sit in certain parts of the football stadium. In 1961, Butts was chosen to run against the incumbent president of the Norfolk NAACP. However, Butts withdrew when it became clear she would lose.

Butts and her lawyer, Joseph A. Jordan Jr., sued the state of Virginia for requiring the poll tax, filing in November 1963. Butts' case was that the tax was unconstitutional since it imposed an "undue financial burden" that violated the equal protection clause of the 14th Amendment. In March 1964, this first case was dismissed, but Butts filed another case and the 4th U.S. Circuit Court of Appeals upheld the tax. Butts appealed the case and the United States Supreme Court decided to hear the appeal in October 1965. Butts' case was combined with a similar case filed by Annie E. Harper, which reached the Supreme Court first. The case, Harper v. Virginia State Board of Elections, was decided in March 1966, making poll taxes unconstitutional.

After the Supreme Court decision, Butts went on to register black voters in Norfolk, signing up 2,882 "in one six month period." Butts, along with Jordan and other community leaders, helped create the Concerned Citizens for Political Education group, which became a powerful political force in local politics in the 1970s.

== Political career ==
Butts was appointed the commissioner of the Norfolk Redevelopment and Housing Authority (NRHA) in 1975. She would serve on the NRHA for twelve years. In 1982, she was appointed by the governor to the State Board of Housing and Community Development.

Butts ran for city council in Norfolk three times in 1980, 1982 and in 1984, but was never successful. Also in 1984, Butts was a witness in a court trial where she supported an at-large election system in Norfolk.

Butts was forced into retirement from politics in 1990 when she was ousted as the chair of the Concerned Citizens for Political Education. Butts died in her home on March 11, 1993. She is buried in Norfolk's Forest Lawn Cemetery.

== Legacy ==
In November 1995, Norfolk named a street in her honor. On March 27, 1996, the city held a celebration to mark the 30th anniversary of the poll tax repeal. During the celebration, they honored Butts and other activists involved. In 2017, Butts' daughter, Charlene Butts Ligon, published a book about her mother called Fearless: How a Poor Virginia Seamstress Took on Jim Crow, Beat the Poll Tax and Changed Her City Forever. The New Journal and Guide called the book "thoughtful and information-filled." The book provides intimate details of Butts' life and her activism as seen through her daughter's eyes.
