= 1876 Connecticut Question 6 =

Referendum repealing requirement of being white to vote

- October 2, 1876
- That article eight of the amendments to the constitution be amended by erasing the word 'white' from the first line.

Results
Choice	Votes	%
Yes	29,954	93.04%
No	2,242	6.96%

Yes
50–60%
60–70%
70–80%
80–90%
90–100%
No
50–60%
60–70%
No Vote

1876 Connecticut Question 6 was a successful amendment to the 1818 Constitution of the U.S. state of Connecticut that removed the requirement that voters be white. The ballot measure was approved with just over 93% of the vote in favor; all counties voted in favor, and only two municipalities voted against: Bethany and Bridgewater.

== Background ==
In 1845, Connecticut voted on a constitutional amendment which provided that to vote, one had to be a white male citizen who was at least 21 years old, and had to have lived in the state for at least a year, and their town for at least six months, and had to have sustained good moral character. The amendment was approved in a 90.90% to 9.10% vote.

In 1870, with the passage of the 15th amendment, it became unconstitutional in the United States to deny the right to vote to a citizen on the basis of their race, color, or previous condition of servitude. Connecticut ratified the amendment on May 19, 1869, becoming the 15th state to do so. The State House had voted on May 14 to ratify it, and did so in a 126 to 104 vote, with 7 legislators either absent or not voting. All Republicans besides one voted in favor, and all Democrats voted against.

== Contents ==
The ballot title was: "Erasing the word 'white' from electoral qualifications."

The summary was: "That article eight of the amendments to the constitution be amended by erasing the word 'white' from the first line."

== Results ==
The amendment was approved by 93% of voters. Individual counties' results ranged from 89.74% to 96.39% in favor.

County	Yes		No	
County	#	%	#	%
Fairfield	4,459	90.28	480	9.72
Hartford	7,986	96.39	299	3.61
Litchfield	3,054	92.41	251	7.59
Middlesex	2,306	94.90	124	5.10
New Haven	5,045	92.13	431	7.87
New London	3,371	91.21	325	8.79
Tolland	1,653	89.74	189	10.26
Windham	2,080	93.57	143	6.43
Total	29,954	93.04	2,242	6.96

== See also ==
- Fifteenth Amendment to the United States Constitution
- Black suffrage in the United States
- Timeline of voting rights in the United States
