= Harman v. Forssenius =

- Supreme Court of the United States

Argued March 1–2, 1965 Decided April 27, 1965
- Full case name: Harman v. Forssenius
- Citations: 380 U.S. 528 (more) 85 S. Ct. 1177; 14 L. Ed. 2d 50; 1965 U.S. LEXIS 1347

Holding
- Virginia's law partially eliminating the poll tax violated the Twenty-fourth Amendment.

Court membership
- Chief Justice Earl Warren Associate Justices Hugo Black · William O. Douglas; Tom C. Clark · John M. Harlan II; William J. Brennan Jr. · Potter Stewart; Byron White · Arthur Goldberg

Case opinion
- Majority: Warren, joined by unanimous

Harman v. Forssenius, 380 U.S. 528 (1965), was a United States Supreme Court case in which the Court ruled that Virginia's partial elimination of the poll tax violated the Twenty-fourth Amendment to the United States Constitution.

Virginia attempted to avoid the effect of the 24th Amendment by creating an "escape clause" to the poll tax. In lieu of paying the poll tax, a prospective voter could apply for a certificate establishing a place of residence in Virginia. The application had to be made six months prior to an election, a measure expected to decrease the number of eligible voters.

In the 1965 Supreme Court decision of Harman v. Forssenius, the Court unanimously found such measures unconstitutional and declared that, for federal elections, "the poll tax is abolished absolutely as a prerequisite to voting, and no equivalent or milder substitute may be imposed."
