= Twenty-fourth Amendment to the United States Constitution =

1964 amendment prohibiting poll taxes

The Twenty-fourth Amendment (Amendment XXIV) of the United States Constitution prohibits both Congress and the states from requiring the payment of a poll tax or any other tax to vote in federal elections. The amendment was proposed by Congress to the states on August 27, 1962, and was ratified by the states on January 23, 1964.

Southern states of the former Confederate States of America adopted poll taxes both in their state laws and in their state constitutions throughout the late-19th and early-20th centuries. This became more widespread as the Democratic Party regained control of most levels of government in the South in the decades after Reconstruction. The purpose of poll taxes was to prevent poor Americans, especially African Americans, from voting. Use of the poll tax by states was held to be constitutional by the Supreme Court of the United States in the 1937 case Breedlove v. Suttles.

When the 24th Amendment was ratified in 1964, five states still retained a poll tax: Alabama, Arkansas, Mississippi, Texas and Virginia. The amendment prohibited a poll tax for voters in federal elections; in 1966, the U.S. Supreme Court ruled 6–3 in Harper v. Virginia State Board of Elections that poll taxes for any level of elections were unconstitutional. It stated that these violated the Equal Protection Clause of the Fourteenth Amendment. Subsequent litigation related to potential discriminatory effects of voter registration requirements has generally been based on application of this clause.

== Text ==
Section 1. The right of citizens of the United States to vote in any primary or other election for President or Vice President, for electors for President or Vice President, or for Senator or Representative in Congress, shall not be denied or abridged by the United States or any State by reason of failure to pay any poll tax or other tax.

Section 2. The Congress shall have power to enforce this article by appropriate legislation.

== Background ==
Poll tax Cumulative poll tax (missed poll taxes from prior years must also be paid to vote) No poll tax History of the poll tax by state from 1868 to 1966

Southern states had adopted the poll tax as a requirement for voting as part of a series of laws in the late 19th century intended to exclude black Americans from politics so far as practicable without violating the Fifteenth Amendment. This required that voting not be limited by "race, color, or previous condition of servitude". All voters were required to pay the poll tax, but in practice it most affected the poor. Notably this affected both African Americans and poor white voters, some of whom had voted with Populist and Fusionist candidates in the late 19th century, temporarily disturbing Democratic rule. Proponents of the poll tax downplayed this aspect and assured white voters they would not be affected. Passage of poll taxes began in earnest in the 1890s, as Democrats wanted to prevent another Populist-Republican coalition. Despite election violence and fraud, African Americans were still winning numerous local seats. By 1902, all eleven states of the former Confederacy had enacted a poll tax, many within new constitutions that contained other provisions as barriers to voter registration, such as literacy or comprehension tests administered subjectively by white workers. The poll tax was used together with other devices such as grandfather clauses and the "white primary" designed to exclude blacks, as well as threats and acts of violence. For example, potential voters had to be "assessed" in Arkansas, and blacks were utterly ignored in the assessment.

From 1900 to 1937, such use of the poll tax was nearly ignored by the federal government. Several state-level initiatives repealed poll taxes during this period for two reasons: firstly that they encouraged corruption since wealthy persons could and would pay other people's poll taxes; secondly, because they discouraged white voting more than many populist Southern politicians desired. The poll tax survived a legal challenge in the 1937 Supreme Court case Breedlove v. Suttles, which unanimously ruled that

[The] privilege of voting is not derived from the United States, but is conferred by the state and, save as restrained by the Fifteenth and Nineteenth Amendments and other provisions of the Federal Constitution, the state may condition suffrage as it deems appropriate.

The issue remained prominent, as most African Americans in the South were disenfranchised. President Franklin D. Roosevelt spoke out against the tax. He publicly called it "a remnant of the Revolutionary period" that the country had moved past. However, Roosevelt's favored liberal Democrats in the South lost in the 1938 primaries to the reigning conservative Southern Democrats, and he backed off the issue. He felt that he needed Southern Democratic votes to pass New Deal programs and did not want to further antagonize them. Still, efforts at the Congressional level to abolish the poll tax continued. A 1939 bill to abolish the poll tax in federal elections was tied up by the Southern Bloc, lawmakers whose long tenure in office from a one-party region gave them seniority and command of numerous important committee chairmanships. A discharge petition was able to force the bill to be considered, and the House passed the bill 254–84. However, the bill was unable to defeat a filibuster in the Senate by Southern senators and a few Northern allies who valued the support of the powerful and senior Southern seats. This bill would be re-proposed in the next several Congresses. It came closest to passage during World War II, when opponents framed abolition as a means to help overseas soldiers vote. However, after learning that the U.S. Supreme Court decision Smith v. Allwright (1944) banned the use of "white primary", the Southern block refused to approve abolition of the poll tax.

In 1946, the Senate came close to passing the bill. 24 Democrats and 15 Republicans approved an end to debate, while 7 non-southern Democrats and 7 Republicans joined the 19 Southern Democrats in opposition. The result was a 39–33 vote in favor of the bill, but a cloture vote to end the filibuster required a two-thirds supermajority of 48 votes at the time, and so the bill was not brought to a vote. Those in favor of abolition of the poll tax considered a constitutional amendment after the 1946 defeat, but that idea did not advance either.

The tenor of the debate changed in the 1940s. Southern politicians tried to re-frame the debate as a constitutional issue, but private correspondence indicates that black disenfranchisement was still the true concern. For instance, Mississippi Senator Theodore Bilbo declared, "If the poll tax bill passes, the next step will be an effort to remove the registration qualification, the educational qualification of Negroes. If that is done we will have no way of preventing the Negroes from voting." This fear explains why even Southern Senators from states that had abolished the poll tax still opposed the bill; they did not want to set a precedent that the federal government could interfere in state elections.

President Harry S. Truman established the President's Committee on Civil Rights, which among other issues, investigated the poll tax. Considering that opposition to federal poll tax regulation in 1948 was claimed as based on the Constitution, the Committee noted that a constitutional amendment might be the best way to proceed. Still, little occurred during the 1950s. Members of the anti-poll tax movement laid low during the anti-Communist frenzy of the period; some of the main proponents of poll tax abolition, such as Joseph Gelders and Vito Marcantonio, had been committed Marxists.

President John F. Kennedy returned to this issue. His administration urged Congress to adopt and send such an amendment to the states for ratification. He considered the constitutional amendment the best way to avoid a filibuster, as the claim that federal abolition of the poll tax was unconstitutional would be moot. Still, some liberals opposed Kennedy's action, feeling that an amendment would be too slow compared to legislation. Spessard Holland, a conservative Democrat from Florida, introduced the amendment to the Senate. Holland had opposed most civil rights legislation during his career, and his support helped splinter monolithic Southern opposition to the amendment. Holland had tried several times earlier in his Senate career to ban the poll tax, but had been unsuccessful. Ratification of the amendment was relatively quick, taking slightly more than a year; it was rapidly ratified by state legislatures across the country from August 1962 to January 1964.

President Lyndon B. Johnson called the amendment a "triumph of liberty over restriction" and "a verification of people's rights". States that had maintained the poll tax were more reserved. Mississippi's attorney general, Joseph Turner Patterson, complained about the complexity of two sets of voters – those who had paid their poll tax and could vote in all elections, and those who had not and could vote only in federal elections. Additionally, non-payers could still be deterred by such requirements as having to register far in advance of the election and retain records of such registration. Some states also continued to exercise discrimination in the application of literacy tests.

== Proposal and ratification ==
Ratified amendment, 1962–1964 Ratified amendment post-enactment, 1977, 1989, 2002, 2009 Rejected amendment Did not ratify amendment^{1}Years are 1977: Virginia; 1989: North Carolina; 2002: Alabama; and 2009: Texas.

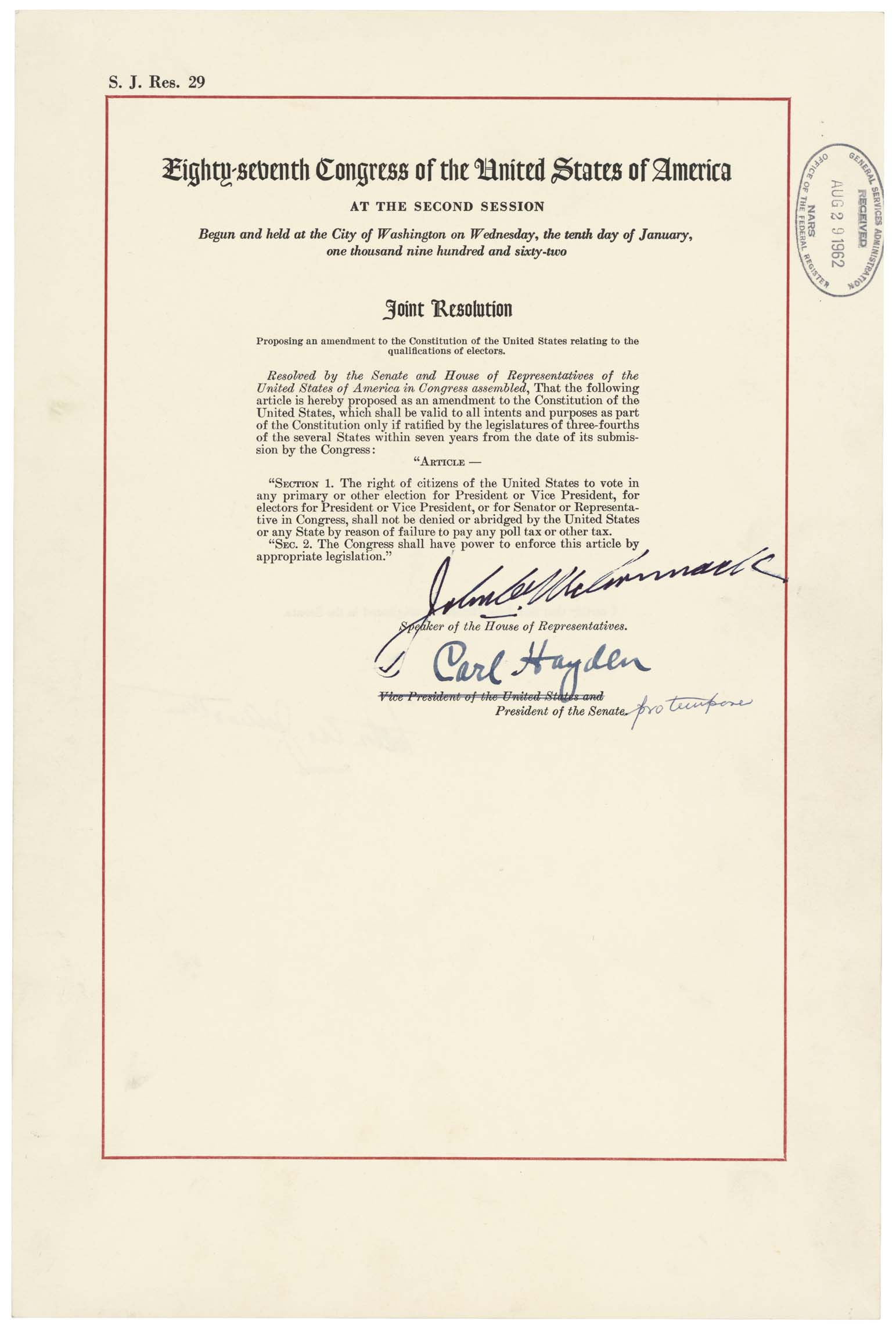
The official Joint Resolution of Congress proposing what became the 24th Amendment as contained in the National Archives

Congress proposed the Twenty-fourth Amendment on August 27, 1962. The amendment was submitted to the states on September 24, 1962, after it passed with the requisite two-thirds majorities in the House and Senate. The final vote in the House was 295–86 (132–15 in the House Republican Conference and 163–71 in the House Democratic Caucus) with 54 members voting present or abstaining, while in the Senate the final vote was 77–16 (30–1 in the Senate Republican Conference and 47–15 in the Senate Democratic Caucus) with 7 members voting present or abstaining. The following states ratified the amendment:

1. Illinois (November 14, 1962)
2. New Jersey (December 3, 1962)
3. Oregon (January 25, 1963)
4. Montana (January 28, 1963)
5. West Virginia (February 1, 1963)
6. New York (February 4, 1963)
7. Maryland (February 6, 1963)
8. California (February 7, 1963)
9. Alaska (February 11, 1963)
10. Rhode Island (February 14, 1963)
11. Indiana (February 19, 1963)
12. Utah (February 20, 1963)
13. Michigan (February 20, 1963)
14. Colorado (February 21, 1963)
15. Ohio (February 27, 1963)
16. Minnesota (February 27, 1963)
17. New Mexico (March 5, 1963)
18. Hawaii (March 6, 1963)
19. North Dakota (March 7, 1963)
20. Idaho (March 8, 1963)
21. Washington (March 14, 1963)
22. Vermont (March 15, 1963)
23. Nevada (March 19, 1963)
24. Connecticut (March 20, 1963)
25. Tennessee (March 21, 1963)
26. Pennsylvania (March 25, 1963)
27. Wisconsin (March 26, 1963)
28. Kansas (March 28, 1963)
29. Massachusetts (March 28, 1963)
30. Nebraska (April 4, 1963)
31. Florida (April 18, 1963)
32. Iowa (April 24, 1963)
33. Delaware (May 1, 1963)
34. Missouri (May 13, 1963)
35. New Hampshire (June 12, 1963)
36. Kentucky (June 27, 1963)
37. Maine (January 16, 1964)
38. South Dakota (January 23, 1964)

Ratification was completed on January 23, 1964. The Georgia legislature did make a last-second attempt to be the 38th state to ratify. This was a surprise as "no Southern help could be expected" for the amendment. The Georgia Senate quickly and unanimously passed it, but the House did not act in time. Georgia's ratification was apparently dropped after South Dakota's ratification.

The amendment was subsequently ratified by the following states:

39. Virginia (February 25, 1977)
40. North Carolina (May 3, 1989)
41. Alabama (April 11, 2002)
42. Texas (May 22, 2009)

The following state rejected the amendment:

1. Mississippi (December 20, 1962)

The following states have not ratified the amendment:

1. Arizona
2. Arkansas
3. Georgia
4. Louisiana
5. Oklahoma
6. South Carolina
7. Wyoming

== Post-ratification law ==
Arkansas effectively repealed its poll tax for all elections with Amendment 51 to the Arkansas Constitution at the November 1964 general election, several months after this amendment was ratified. The poll-tax language was not completely stricken from its Constitution until Amendment 85 in 2008. Of the five states originally affected by this amendment, Arkansas was the only one to repeal its poll tax; the other four retained their taxes. These were struck down in 1966 by the US Supreme Court decision in Harper v. Virginia Board of Elections (1966), which ruled poll taxes unconstitutional even for state elections. Federal district courts in Alabama and Texas, respectively, struck down these states' poll taxes less than two months before the Harper ruling was issued.

The state of Virginia accommodated the amendment by providing an "escape clause" to the poll tax. In lieu of paying the poll tax, a prospective voter could file paperwork to gain a certificate establishing a place of residence in Virginia. The papers would have to be filed six months in advance of voting, and the voter had to provide a copy of that certificate at the time of voting. This measure was expected to decrease the number of legal voters. In the 1965 Supreme Court decision Harman v. Forssenius, the Court unanimously found such measures unconstitutional. It declared that for federal elections, "the poll tax is abolished absolutely as a prerequisite to voting, and no equivalent or milder substitute may be imposed."

While not directly related to the Twenty-fourth Amendment, the Harper case held that the poll tax was unconstitutional at every level, not just for federal elections. The Harper decision relied upon the Equal Protection Clause of the Fourteenth Amendment, rather than the Twenty-fourth Amendment. As such, issues related to whether burdens on voting are equivalent to poll taxes in discriminatory effect have usually been litigated on Equal Protection grounds since.

== See also ==
- 2018 Florida Amendment 4
