= Warren Trading Post Co. v. Arizona Tax Commission =

Warren Trading Post Co. v. Arizona Tax Comm'n
- Supreme Court of the United States

Decided April 29, 1965
- Full case name: Warren Trading Post Company v. Arizona Tax Commission
- Citations: 380 U.S. 685 (more)

Holding
- The comprehensive federal regulatory regime for trade on Indian reservations preempted a state income tax on that trade.

Court membership
- Chief Justice Earl Warren Associate Justices Hugo Black · William O. Douglas; Tom C. Clark · John M. Harlan II; William J. Brennan Jr. · Potter Stewart; Byron White · Arthur Goldberg

Case opinion
- Majority: Black, joined by unanimous

Laws applied
- Indian Commerce Clause

Warren Trading Post Co. v. Arizona Tax Commission, 380 U.S. 685 (1965), was a United States Supreme Court case in which the Court held that the comprehensive federal regulatory regime for trade on Indian reservations preempted a state income tax on that trade.
