= Breedlove v. Suttles =

- Supreme Court of the United States

Argued November 16–17, 1937 Decided December 6, 1937
- Full case name: Breedlove v. Suttles, Tax Collector
- Citations: 302 U.S. 277 (more) 58 S. Ct. 205; 82 L. Ed. 252

Case history
- Prior: Appeal from the Supreme Court of Georgia

Court membership
- Chief Justice Charles E. Hughes Associate Justices James C. McReynolds · Louis Brandeis; George Sutherland · Pierce Butler; Harlan F. Stone · Owen Roberts; Benjamin N. Cardozo · Hugo Black

Case opinion
- Majority: Butler, joined by unanimous

Laws applied
- U.S. Const. amends. XIV, XIX
- Superseded by
- U.S. Const. amend. XXIV
- Overruled by
- Harper v. Virginia State Board of Elections, 383 U.S. 663 (1966)

Breedlove v. Suttles, 302 U.S. 277 (1937), is an overturned United States Supreme Court decision which upheld the constitutionality of requiring the payment of a poll tax in order to vote in state elections.

== Background ==
At the relevant time, Georgia imposed a poll tax of $1.00 per year, levied generally on all inhabitants. The statute exempted from the tax all persons under 21 or over 60 years of age, and all females who do not register for voting. Under the state constitution, the tax must be paid by the person liable, together with arrears, before he can be registered for voting.

Nolan Breedlove, a white male, 28 years of age, declined to pay the tax, and was not allowed to register to vote. He filed a lawsuit challenging the Georgia law under the Fourteenth (both the Equal Protection Clause and the Privileges and Immunities Clause) and the Nineteenth amendments. T. Earl Suttles was named defendant in the case in his official capacity as tax collector of Fulton County, Georgia.

== Opinion of the Court ==
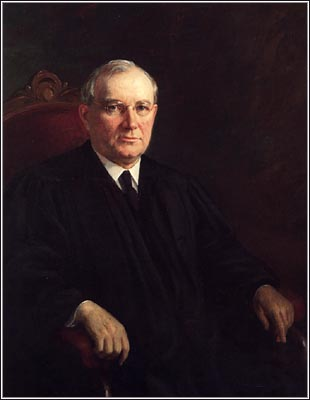
Justice Butler delivered the unanimous opinion of the Court.

Associate Justice Pierce Butler delivered the opinion of the court, which unanimously upheld the Georgia law.

With respect to the differential treatment of men and women under the law, the court held that differences between women and men allowed for special consideration to be given to women:

The tax being upon persons, women may be exempted on the basis of special considerations to which they are naturally entitled. In view of burdens necessarily borne by them for the preservation of the race, the State reasonably may exempt them from poll taxes.

With respect to the age discrimination claim, the court held that the upper age limit to the tax was similar to exemptions by age given for military or jury service.

With respect to the Nineteenth Amendment, which states that "The right of citizens of the United States to vote shall not be denied or abridged by the United States or by any State on account of sex", the court dismissed the notion that the purpose of the tax was "to deny or abridge the right of men to vote on account of their sex", and denied the claim as a result.

== Subsequent developments ==
Georgia abolished its poll tax in 1945.

This decision remained precedent until 1966, when the Supreme Court reversed it in a 6–3 decision in Harper v. Virginia State Board of Elections. Two years earlier, the 24th Amendment had been ratified, prohibiting the use of the poll tax (or any other tax) as a precondition for voting in federal elections. Justice Hugo Black, who participated both in the Breedlove decision and in the Harper decision, dissented from the Harper decision declaring the poll tax to be unconstitutional.

== See also ==
- List of United States Supreme Court cases, volume 302
