= List of United States Supreme Court cases, volume 380 =

This is a list of all the United States Supreme Court cases from volume 380 of the United States Reports:

- Udall v. Tallman, 380 U.S. 1 (1965)
- Singer v. United States, 380 U.S. 24 (1965)
- Crider v. Zurich Ins. Co., 380 U.S. 39 (1965)
- Freedman v. Maryland, 380 U.S. 51 (1965)
- United States v. Gainey, 380 U.S. 63 (1965)
- Carrington v. Rash, 380 U.S. 89 (1965)
- United States v. Ventresca, 380 U.S. 102 (1965)
- In re Ryan, 380 U.S. 124 (1965) (per curiam)
- Mason v. Midwestern Gas Transmission Co., 380 U.S. 124 (1965) (per curiam)
- City of Coronado v. San Diego Unified Port Dist., 380 U.S. 125 (1965) (per curiam)
- Drueding v. Devlin, 380 U.S. 125 (1965) (per curiam)
- Maddox v. Birzgalis, 380 U.S. 126 (1965) (per curiam)
- Bonanno v. Louisiana, 380 U.S. 126 (1965) (per curiam)
- Blaauw v. Grand Trunk Western R. Co., 380 U.S. 127 (1965) (per curiam)
- United States v. Mississippi, 380 U.S. 128 (1965)
- Louisiana v. United States, 380 U.S. 145 (1965)
- United States v. Boston & Maine R. Co., 380 U.S. 157 (1965)
- United States v. Seeger, 380 U.S. 163 (1965)
- Department of Mental Hygiene of Cal. v. Kirchner, 380 U.S. 194 (1965)
- Swain v. Alabama, 380 U.S. 202 (1965)
- Hughes Tool Co. v. Trans World Airlines, Inc., 380 U.S. 248 (1965) (per curiam)
- Hughes Tool Co. v. Trans World Airlines, Inc., 380 U.S. 249 (1965) (per curiam)
- Arthur v. Colorado, 380 U.S. 250 (1965) (per curiam)
- Hall v. Illinois, 380 U.S. 250 (1965) (per curiam)
- Davis v. Mabry, 380 U.S. 251 (1965) (per curiam)
- Stadler v. State Bd. of Equalization of Cal., 380 U.S. 252 (1965) (per curiam)
- Barnes v. Texas, 380 U.S. 253 (1965) (per curiam)
- Seals v. Alabama, 380 U.S. 254 (1965) (per curiam)
- Radio & Television Technicians v. Broadcast Service of Mobile, Inc., 380 U.S. 255 (1965) (per curiam)
- Reserve Life Ins. Co. v. Bowers, 380 U.S. 258 (1965) (per curiam)
- Trans-Lux Distributing Corp. v. Board of Regents of Univ. of N. Y., 380 U.S. 259 (1965) (per curiam)
- Santos v. Texas, 380 U.S. 259 (1965) (per curiam)
- Baker v. Alaska, 380 U.S. 260 (1965) (per curiam)
- Martinez v. United States, 380 U.S. 260 (1965) (per curiam)
- Harrison v. McNamara, 380 U.S. 261 (1965) (per curiam)
- Genovese v. Ohio, 380 U.S. 261 (1965) (per curiam)
- Marvel v. United States, 380 U.S. 262 (1965) (per curiam)
- Textile Workers v. Darlington Manufacturing Company, 380 U.S. 263 (1965)
- NLRB v. Brown Food Stores, 380 U.S. 278 (1965)
- American Ship Building Co. v. NLRB, 380 U.S. 300 (1965)
- Sansone v. United States, 380 U.S. 343 (1965)
- Henry v. Collins, 380 U.S. 356 (1965) (per curiam)
- O'Keeffe v. Smith, Hinchman & Grylls Associates, Inc., 380 U.S. 359 (1965) (per curiam)
- Chicago, R. I. & P. R. Co. v. United States, 380 U.S. 373 (1965) (per curiam)
- FTC v. Colgate-Palmolive Co., 380 U.S. 374 (1965)
- Pointer v. Texas, 380 U.S. 400 (1965)
- Douglas v. Alabama, 380 U.S. 415 (1965)
- Burnett v. New York Central R. Co., 380 U.S. 424 (1965)
- NLRB v. Metropolitan Life Ins. Co., 380 U.S. 438 (1965)
- Jenkins v. United States, 380 U.S. 445 (1965) (per curiam)
  - It is a due process violation for the judge to instruct the jury that they must reach a decision in a case.
- Abernathy v. Alabama, 380 U.S. 447 (1965) (per curiam)
- Chicago & North Western R. Co. v. Chicago, M., St. P. & P. R. Co., 380 U.S. 448 (1965) (per curiam)
- McKinnie v. Tennessee, 380 U.S. 449 (1965) (per curiam)
- U.S. A. C. Transport, Inc. v. United States, 380 U.S. 450 (1965) (per curiam)
- American Oil Co. v. Neill, 380 U.S. 451 (1965)
- Hanna v. Plumer, 380 U.S. 460 (1965)
- Dombrowski v. Pfister, 380 U.S. 479 (1965)
- American Comm. for Protection of Foreign Born v. Subversive Activities Control Bd., 380 U.S. 503 (1965) (per curiam)
- Veterans of Abraham Lincoln Brigade v. Subversive Activities Control Bd., 380 U.S. 513 (1965) (per curiam)
- Texas v. New Jersey, 380 U.S. 518 (1965)
- Callender v. Florida, 380 U.S. 519 (1965) (per curiam)
- Gold v. DiCarlo, 380 U.S. 520 (1965) (per curiam)
- Corpora v. New York, 380 U.S. 520 (1965) (per curiam)
- Cumberland Farms Northern, Inc. v. Maine Milk Comm'n, 380 U.S. 521 (1965) (per curiam)
- Brown v. California, 380 U.S. 521 (1965)
- Western & Southern Life Ins. Co. v. NLRB, 380 U.S. 522 (1965) (per curiam)
- Metropolitan Life Ins. Co. v. NLRB, 380 U.S. 523 380 U.S. 525 (1965) (per curiam)
- Thomas v. Mississippi, 380 U.S. 524 (1965) (per curiam)
- Metropolitan Life Ins. Co. v. NLRB, 380 U.S. 525 (1965) (per curiam)
- Carolina & Northwestern R. Co. v. United States, 380 U.S. 526 (1965) (per curiam)
- Murray v. United States, 380 U.S. 527 (1965) (per curiam)
- Harman v. Forssenius, 380 U.S. 528 (1965)
- Armstrong v. Manzo, 380 U.S. 545 (1965)
- General Motors Corp. v. District of Columbia, 380 U.S. 553 (1965)
- Commissioner v. Brown, 380 U.S. 563 (1965)
- FTC v. Consolidated Foods Corp., 380 U.S. 592 (1965)
- Griffin v. California, 380 U.S. 609 (1965)
- Paragon Jewel Coal Co. v. Commissioner, 380 U.S. 624 (1965)
- Railway Clerks v. Association for Benefit of Noncontract Employees, 380 U.S. 650 (1965)
- Commissioner v. Estate of Noel, 380 U.S. 678 (1965)
- Warren Trading Post Co. v. Arizona Tax Comm'n, 380 U.S. 685 (1965)
- One 1958 Plymouth Sedan v. Pennsylvania, 380 U.S. 693 (1965)
