= Poll taxes in the United States =

Tax required to vote

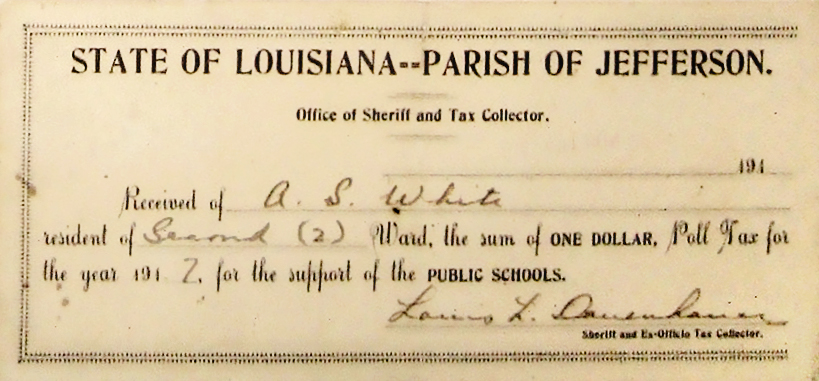
Receipt for payment of poll tax, Jefferson Parish, Louisiana, 1917 (equivalent to $25 in 2025)

History of poll taxes as a condition to voting in the former Confederate States of America

Poll taxes were used in the United States until they were outlawed under section 10 of the Voting Rights Act of 1965. Poll taxes (taxes of a fixed amount on every liable individual, regardless of their income) had also been a major source of government funding among the colonies and states which went on to form the United States. Poll taxes became a tool of disenfranchisement in the South during Jim Crow, following the end of Reconstruction. The 24th Amendment, ratified January 23, 1964, abolished the use poll taxes for Federal elections in the United States. The operative clause reads:

The right of citizens of the United States to vote in any primary or other election for President or Vice President, for electors for President or Vice President, or for Senator or Representative in Congress, shall not be denied or abridged by the United States or any State by reason of failure to pay any poll tax or other tax.

— U.S. Const. amend. XXIV, § 1

The ratification of the 24th Amendment was followed by the passage of the Voting Rights Act of 1965, to which section 10 empowered the United States Attorney General to bring lawsuits to enjoin poll taxes in State and local elections. Finally, in Harper v. Virginia State Board of Elections (1966), the Supreme Court held that poll taxes violated the Equal Protection Clause of the 14th Amendment.

== Description ==
A poll tax is a tax of a fixed sum on every liable individual (typically every adult), without reference to income or resources. Various privileges of citizenship, including voter registration, issuance of driving licenses, resident hunting, and fishing licenses, were conditioned on payment of poll taxes to encourage the collection of this tax revenue. In places that instituted a cumulative poll tax, missed poll taxes from prior years must also be paid to receive the restricted privileges.

== History ==
Although often associated with states of the former Confederate States of America, poll taxes were also in place in some northern and western states. This included California, Connecticut, Maine, Massachusetts, Minnesota, New Hampshire, Ohio, Pennsylvania, Vermont, Rhode Island, and Wisconsin. Poll taxes had been a major source of government funding among the colonies which formed the United States. For instance, poll taxes made up from one-third to one-half of the tax revenue of colonial Massachusetts.

Property taxes assumed a larger share of tax revenues. Land values rose when population increased, which encouraged settlement in the American West. Some western states found no need for poll tax requirements; but poll taxes and payment incentives remained in eastern states.

=== Voter registration ===
Poll taxes became a tool of disenfranchisement in the South during Jim Crow, following the end of Reconstruction. Payment of a poll tax was a prerequisite to the registration for voting in a number of states until 1965. The tax emerged in some states of the United States in the late nineteenth century as part of the Jim Crow laws. After the right to vote was extended to all races by the enactment of the Fifteenth Amendment to the United States Constitution, a number of states enacted poll tax laws as a device for restricting voting rights. The laws often included a grandfather clause, which allowed any adult male whose father or grandfather had voted in a specific year prior to the abolition of slavery to vote without paying the tax. These laws, along with unfairly implemented literacy tests and extra-legal intimidation, such as by the Ku Klux Klan, achieved the desired effect of disenfranchising Asian-American, Native American voters and poor whites as well. The poll tax was particularly disproportionately directed at African-American voters.

Proof of payment of a poll tax was a prerequisite to voter registration in Florida, Alabama, Tennessee, Arkansas, Louisiana, Mississippi, Georgia (1877), North and South Carolina, Virginia (until 1882 and again from 1902 with its new constitution), and Texas (1902). The Texas poll tax, instituted on people who were eligible to vote in all other respects, was between $1.50 and $1.75 ($65.12 in 2025). This was "a lot of money at the time, and a big barrier to the working classes and poor." Georgia created a cumulative poll tax requirement in 1877: men of any race 21 to 60 years of age had to pay a sum of money for every year from the time they had turned 21, or from the time that the law took effect.

The poll tax requirements applied to whites as well as blacks, and also adversely affected poor citizens. The laws that allowed the poll tax did not specify a certain group of people. This meant that anyone, including white women, could also be discriminated against when they went to vote. One example is in Alabama, where white women were discriminated against and then organized to secure their right to vote. One group of women that did this was the Women's Joint Legislative Council of Alabama (WJLC). African American women also organized in groups against being denied voting rights. In 1942, an African American woman named Lottie Polk Gaffney, along with four other women, unsuccessfully sued the South Carolina Cherokee County Registration Board with the help of the NAACP. Gaffney sued for her right to vote after having been stopped from registering to vote two years earlier. As a result of her suing the county the mailman did not deliver her mail "for a time."

Many states required payment of the tax at a time separate from the election and then required voters to bring receipts with them to the polls. If they could not locate such receipts, they could not vote. In addition, many states surrounded registration and voting with complex record-keeping requirements. These were particularly difficult for sharecropper and tenant farmers to comply with, as they moved frequently.

During the first half of the 20th Century, Memphis, Tennessee was controlled by a political machine run by E. H. Crump, and Memphis was one of the few places in the South where blacks regularly voted. This situation arose because Crump's party paid their poll tax to encourage them to vote for his preferred candidates.

The poll tax was sometimes used alone or together with a literacy qualification. In a kind of grandfather clause, North Carolina in 1900 exempted from the poll tax those men entitled to vote as of January 1, 1867. The grandfather clauses allowed white men whose ancestors had previously voted to bypass the literacy qualifications and poll taxes. This ensured that it would have excluded all blacks, who did not then have suffrage.

=== Judicial challenge ===
In 1937, in Breedlove v. Suttles, 302 U.S. 277 (1937), the United States Supreme Court found that poll tax as a prerequisite for registration to vote was constitutional. The case involved the Georgia poll tax of $1 (equivalent to $22 in 2025). Georgia abolished its poll tax in 1945. Florida repealed its poll tax in 1937.

The 24th Amendment, ratified in 1964, abolished the use of the poll tax (or any other tax) as a pre-condition for voting in federal elections, but made no mention of poll taxes in state elections. The Voting Rights Act of 1965 made clarifying remarks which helped to outlaw the practice nationwide, as well as make it enforceable by law.

In the 1966 case of Harper v. Virginia State Board of Elections, the Supreme Court reversed its decision in Breedlove v. Suttles to also include the imposition of poll taxes in state elections as violating the Equal Protection Clause of the 14th Amendment to the United States Constitution. The 14th amendment granted citizenship to all born/naturalized in the United States, guaranteed "due process" and "equal protection" under the law.

The Harper ruling was one of several that relied on the Equal Protection clause of the 14th Amendment rather than the more direct provision of the 24th Amendment. In a two-month period in the spring of 1966, Federal courts declared unconstitutional poll tax laws in the last four states that still had them, starting with Texas on February 9. Decisions followed for Alabama (March 3) and Virginia (March 25). Mississippi's $2.00 poll tax (equivalent to $20 in 2025) was the last to fall, declared unconstitutional on April 8, 1966, by a federal panel. Virginia attempted to partially abolish its poll tax by requiring a residence certification, but the Supreme Court rejected the arrangement in 1965 in Harman v. Forssenius.

=== Poll taxes by state ===
State	Cost	Implementation	Repeal
Alabama	$1.50 ($58.05 in 2025)	1901	1966
Arkansas	$1.00 ($35.83 in 2025)	1891 (Note: Legislation was passed by the House of the Assembly in 1891 and confirmed by voter referendum in 1892.)	1964
California	$2.00 ($77.40 in 2025)	1850	1914
Connecticut	$2.00 ($69.11 in 2025)	1649	1947
Delaware	Each county can determine its own amount.	1897	
Florida	$1.00 ($35.83 in 2025)	1885 (Note: Though poll tax legislation was approved in 1885, charging the tax as a condition of voting did not occur until 1889.)	1937
Georgia	$1.00 ($30.23 in 2025)	1877 (Note: While the Constitution of 1877 allowed collection of poll taxes to fund schools, the requirement to pay as a prerequisite to voting was not authorized until 1908.)	1945
Louisiana	$1.00 ($38.70 in 2025)	1898	1934
Maine	$3.00 ($103.66 in 2025)	1845	1973
Massachusetts	$3.00 ($63.10 in 2025)	1865	1890
Minnesota	$1.00 ($26.15 in 2025)	1863	?
Mississippi	$2.00 ($71.67 in 2025)	1890	1966
New Hampshire	$3.00 ($56.69 in 2025)	?	?
North Carolina	$1.00 ($18.90 in 2025) to 2.00 ($37.79 in 2025)	1900	1920
Oklahoma	$2.00 ($69.11 in 2025)	1907	1986
Pennsylvania	$1.00 ($18.90 in 2025) to 5.00 ($94.48 in 2025)	1865	1933
Rhode Island	$1.00	1865	?
South Carolina	$1.00 ($38.70 in 2025)	1895	1951
Tennessee	$1.00 ($25.46 in 2025)	1870 (Note: The State Constitution established a poll tax in 1870, but it remained unimplemented until 1890 when the legislature activated it.)	1953
Texas	$1.50 ($55.82 in 2025) to 1.75 ($65.12 in 2025)	1902	1966
Vermont	$1.00 ($17.26 in 2025)	1778	1982
Virginia	$65.00 in 2021	1902 ($55.82 in 2025)	1966

== See also ==
- Women's poll tax repeal movement
- Voter ID laws in the United States
