= Flag of Earth =

Conceptual flag

The flag of Earth is a conceptual idea proposing a unified flag design that represents the entire planet rather than any single nation, culture, or political entity. Its purpose is to symbolize Earth as a shared home, the collective identity of humankind, or even the aspirations of a future world government. Over time, artists, designers, activists, and visionaries have created numerous proposals for what such a flag might look like. Each design highlights different aspects of our global identity—some emphasize the planet's natural features, such as oceans and continents, while others focus on themes like peace, unity, cooperation, or humanity's place in the universe. These flags often appear in discussions about global citizenship, space exploration, and international collaboration, reflecting the idea that despite national borders, all people ultimately belong to one interconnected world. Many science fiction works have also featured their own flag designs, often incorporating real-world imagery like the Earth itself to signify a singular world government.

== Proposed flags of Earth ==
=== Earth Flag (1969) ===
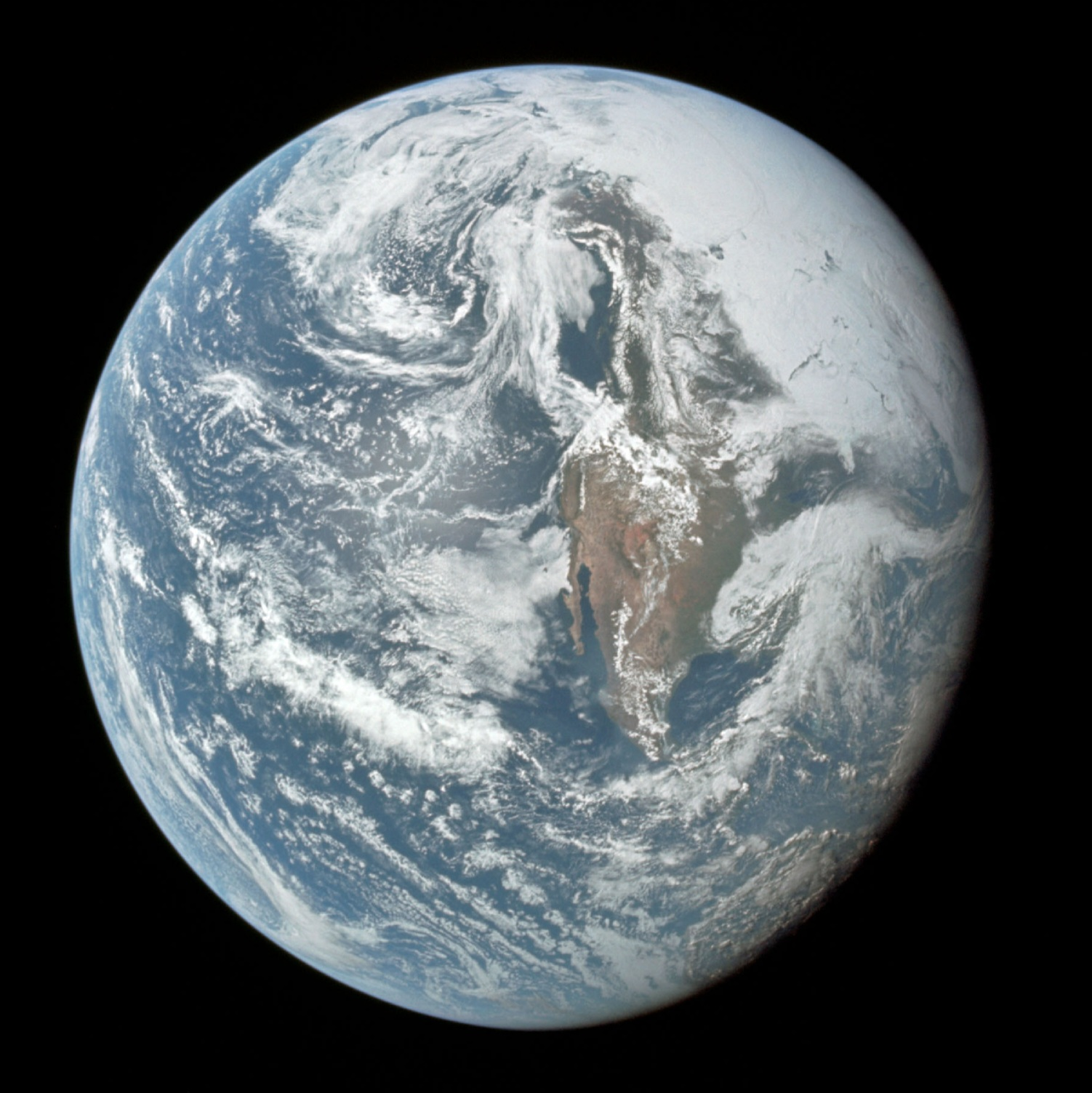
The photograph of Earth taken by the crew of the Apollo 10 on 18 May 1969, used in the first version of the flag design proposed by John McConnell

The original 1969 version of the Earth Flag by McConnell, with the simplified image of the Earth

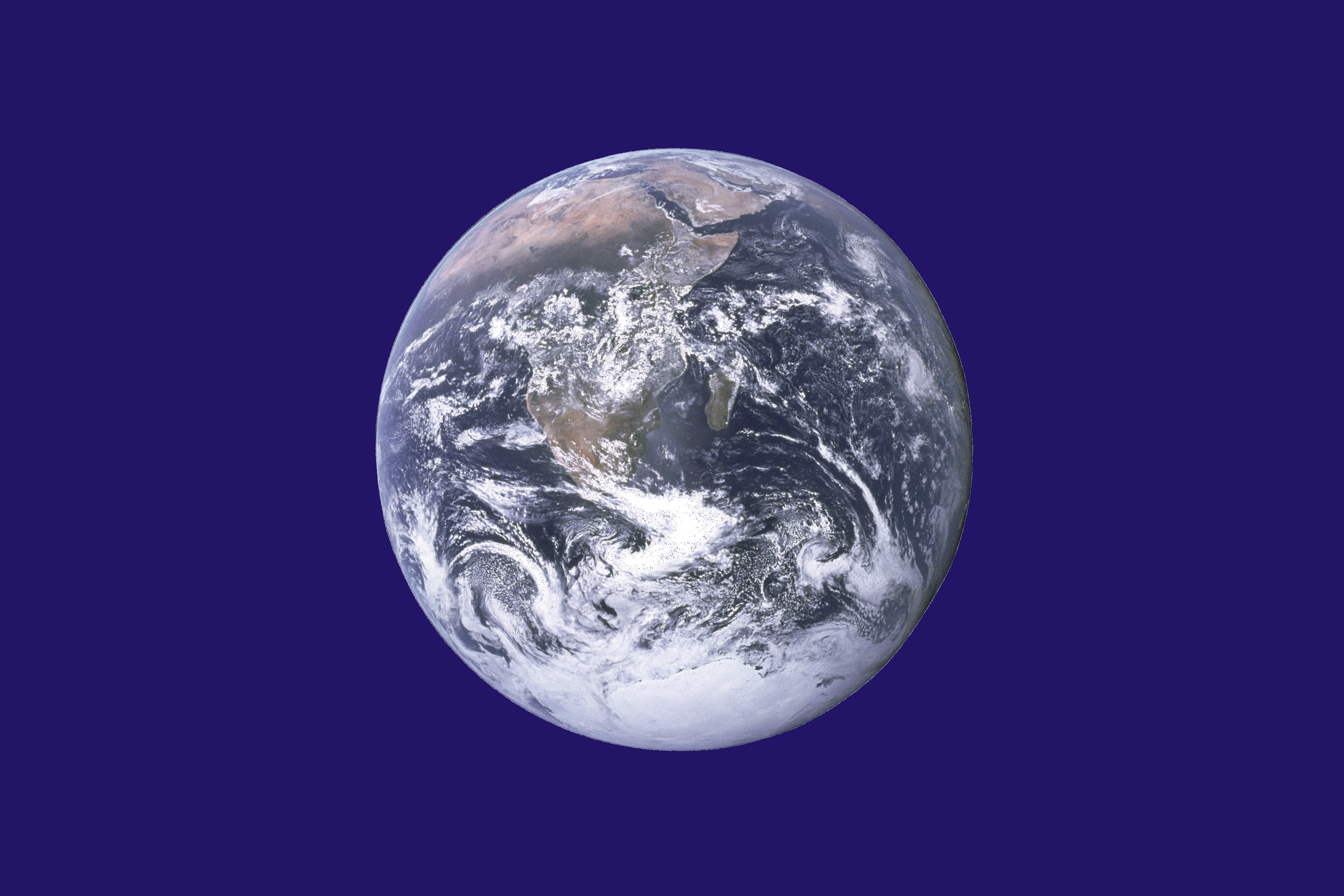
The current 1973 version of the Earth Flag, proposed by McConnell

During 1969, peace activist John McConnell proposed his design titled the Earth Flag. The current version of the flag consists of The Blue Marble, a photograph of Earth taken on 7 December 1972 by the crew of the Apollo 17 on its way to the Moon. The planet is placed on the dark blue background. Prior to 1973, the flag design used photograph no. 69HC487, taken by the crew of the Apollo 10 on 18 May 1969. Early flag versions also had simpler designs, depicting white outlines of the clouds on the light blue circle, instead of the more detailed photograph of the planet.

The design debuted at the Moon Watch event in Central Park, New York City, on 20 July 1969, during which people watched and celebrated the first Moon landing by the crew of the Apollo 11. On 22 April 1970, McConnell organized the first Earth Day, in San Francisco, California, at which his flags were used. Since then, the flag has become widely associated with Earth Day. In 1992, astronaut Anatoly Berezovoy carried the Earth Flag with him during his time in space.

=== Flag of Planet Earth (1970) ===
Flag of Earth proposed by James W. Cadle in 1970

In May 1970, James W. Cadle, a farmer from Homer, Illinois, proposed his version of the flag of Earth, which consisted of a blue circle representing the Earth, placed in the centre of the flag, in front of a segment of a larger yellow circle, representing the Sun, placed on the left side of the flag, and a smaller white circle, representing the Moon, located in the bottom right corner of the flag, with everything placed on a black background, representing outer space. It gained popularity among the SETI researchers and is flown at numerous SETI research facilities around the world. Notably, the flag flew at the Ohio State University Radio Observatory, in Delaware, Ohio. On 23 December 1996, in honour of the death of Carl Sagan three days prior, the flag was flown there at half-mast.

Earth Flag Co. International, founded by Cadle, originally distributed the flag. The design entered the public domain in 2003. Following Cadle's death, the flag distribution is being continued by the North American Astrophysical Observatory.

=== The World Flag (1988) ===
The 1988 version of The World Flag proposed by Paul Carroll

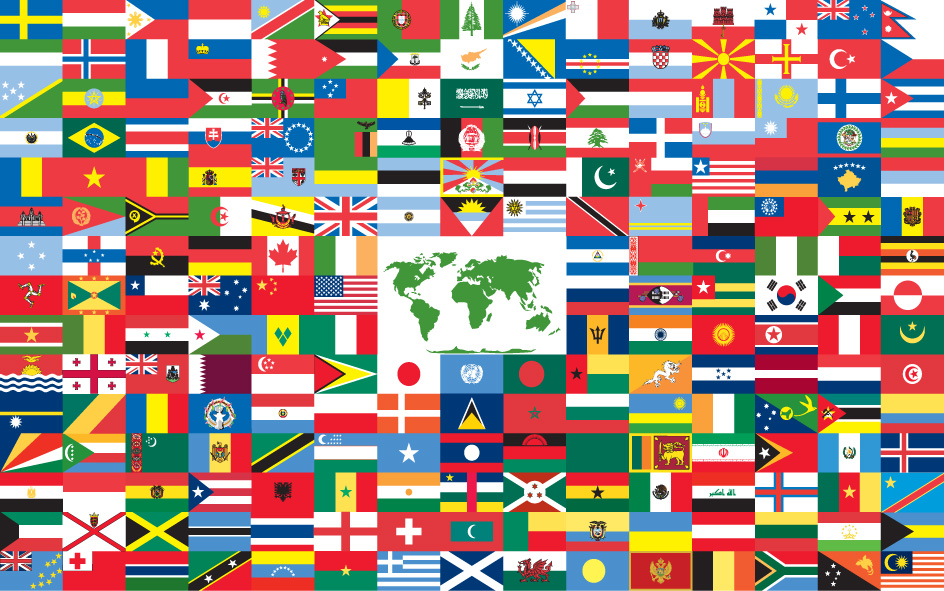
The 2006 version of The World Flag proposed by Paul Carroll

In 1988, Paul Carroll proposed a design titled The World Flag that combined the flags of 159 member states of the United Nations. It was created to promote global unity and cooperation. The flag depicted the national flags side by side. In the centre of the flag was placed a Dymaxion map of the world. The design was updated in 1992, expanding the number of flags included to a total of 230, adding all national flags used at the time, and additionally including the flag of the United Nations, and flags of the various self-governing dependant territories. The flag was again updated in 2006, 2008, and 2011, to accommodate for the changes of the national flags and political events. Through the redesigns, the map in the centre of the flag was also changed.

=== International Flag of Planet Earth (2015) ===
The International Flag of Planet Earth design proposed by Oskar Pernefeldt

In 2015, Swedish designer Oskar Pernefeldt proposed a flag called the International Flag of Planet Earth. The design consists of the first stage of the flower of life (seven joined rings of the same radius, with the six outer rings drawn around the first ring spaced exactly one radian apart). The shape represents the life on the planet, and the connection of everything on it to everything else. The number of circles may represent the planet's seven continents. The symbol is placed on a dark blue background, which represents water, an essential part of the planet's life, and the oceans, which cover most of the surface of Earth. The flag's height-to-width aspect ratio is 2:3.

Oskar Pernefeldt designed the flag as a graduate thesis, but the flag quickly became popular internationally. The release of a press kit inspired widespread media attention, and the website Pernefeldt created for the flag received more than half a million views in its first 24 hours. Many outlets speculated about the design's use in space travel, particularly humans reaching Mars.

The International Flag of Planet Earth Organization (IFOPE-O) is a registered 501(c)(4) nonprofit organization founded by Pernefeldt to promote the proposal. Its mission is to make this flag recognized as the flag of Earth by serving as its awareness agency.

=== The One World Flag (2016) ===
The One World Flag design by Thomas Mandl

In 2016, photographer Thomas Mandl unveiled the One World Flag: a simple design featuring a blue dot at its center, meant to represent the planet. Because a traditional round flag was impractical, the design uses a transparent rectangular field in the usual 2:3 ratio, allowing the flag's background to change with its surroundings. Mandl stated that in this way, the flag was a dynamic symbol of Earth itself, always changing, just like the world it stood for.

Mandl introduced the project in 2018 to continue the conversation around a shared global flag, and in 2019 he began distributing One World Flags worldwide to raise planetary solidarity.

== Proposed flags with underlying themes ==
=== World Peace Flag of Earth (1913) ===
World Peace Flag of Earth

In 1913, James Charles van Kirk, a Methodist minister from Youngstown, Ohio, designed the first known flag proposed as the peace flag and the flag of Earth. The design includes the rainbow flag on the left, consisting of red, green, yellow, orange, blue, purple, and pink stripes. To the right is depicted a brown globe with a coordinate grid, including the latitude lines that go from the longitude lines of the north and south polar circles. In the middle of the globe is placed a white horizontal stripe. The globe is connected to the rainbow flag via thin white stripes going from the side of the white stripe on the globe to the outer boundaries of the coloured stripes on the rainbow flag. Both objects are placed on the dark blue background with 46 stars surrounding them.

In 1913 and 1929, Kirk made a peace tour through Europe with his flag, promoting "the brotherhood of man and the Fatherhood of God". The Universal Peace Congress adopted Kirk's design as its official World Peace Flag. It was subsequently adopted by the American Peace Society as well as other groups.

=== Citizen of the World Flag (1937) ===
"Citizen of the World Flag" by George Dibbern (1937)

George Dibbern presented the flag on July 1, 1937, and the reason for its creation was the reluctance to use the flag of Nazi Germany on his yacht Te Rapunga. In 1939, residency was denied Dibbern as he refused to take up arms for any country, and he became widely known as a "man without a country". In 1940, in San Francisco, eight years before American actor and peace activist Garry Davis renounced his citizenship, Dibbern created his own passport declaring himself a "Friend of all peoples" and a "Citizen of the World." He described his flag with these words:

It has a white ground with a red cross of St. George cutting a dark blue circle; and in the upper left corner is a blue star. The white stands for equal rights — not equality, but equal rights for men to evolve, each according to his individuality. On this right the human world stands or falls. The dark blue circle stands for the brotherhood of man, for though we fight like brothers we must grow a loyalty to our one family if we are to survive. On top of the circle of brotherhood lies the red cross of freedom and of pain. It is through freedom to experience, and the pain experience brings, that we learn. The blue circle also represents a planet, like the earth, which receives its light from the sun as we have received our light from God. But I believe that God is within each of us, and that our aim should be to be conscious of him, to become a self-shining light, a star. So the star in the comer represents my aim. It is a blue star because I try to become a brother of a new brotherhood.

=== The Brotherhood Flag (1938) ===
The Brotherhood Flag

In 1938, the Minnesota-based World Peace Association unveiled a flag to represent all humanity. Called the "Brotherhood Flag", it consisted of five equal horizontal stripes of red, white, brown, yellow, and black.

The World Peace Association described their flag this way:

"The Brotherhood Flag consists of five equal stripes of equal width. The length of the flag is twice the width of the five stripes combined. Each stripe represents one of the five groups of the human race, namely: red, white, brown, yellow, and black. Respectful display of this flag will help promote unity, equality, freedom, peace, brotherhood and a genuine respect for international law, among all peoples of the earth."

This flag was carried at peace marches in the 1960s and may have helped inspire designer Gilbert Baker to create the rainbow flag celebrating LGBT+ rights in 1978.

=== Blue Dot Flag (2019) ===
The Blue Dot Flag design proposed by Tijs Bonekamp

In 2019, Dutch designer Tijs Bonekamp proposed a flag called the Blue Dot Flag, after the Pale Blue Dot photograph of the Earth. His design consists of a blue circle centered in a green field, and resembles a minimalist, easy-to-draw version of the Earth Flag. The blue circle is a representation of the planet Earth, while the pale green stands for all its biodiversity. The flag's height-to-width aspect ratio is 2:3. The flag is registered as a nonprofit organization, the Blue Dot Foundation.

The Blue Dot aims to be a unifying, non-political symbol of hope for the Earth's natural space health. Its use is intended for everyone who feels connected to the planet and for everyone who wants to help raise awareness in a context of Earth degradation and climate change.

== Flags of international organizations ==
=== United Nations ===
The flag of the United Nations

The United Nations is an intergovernmental organization whose stated purposes are to maintain international peace and security, develop friendly relations among nations, achieve international cooperation, and be a centre for harmonizing the actions of nations. It is the world's largest and most familiar international organization. It consists of 193 members, representing almost all of the world's sovereign states.

Its flag features a geographical representation of the planet, and its high visibility makes it a well-known candidate to represent Earth. During planning for NASA's lunar landings in the 1960s, it was even suggested that the United Nations flag be used instead of the United States flag.

The flag consists of a white emblem on the sky blue background. The emblem depicts an azimuthal equidistant projection of the world map, centred on the North Pole, with the globe being bisected in the centre by the prime meridian and the International Date Line, thus ensuring that no country is at prominence within the flag. The map projection extends to 60 degrees south latitude, and includes five concentric circles. The map is inscribed in a wreath consisting of crossed conventionalized branches of the olive tree. The emblem on the flag is one half the width of the flag itself. The flag proportions of the aspect ratio of the flag height to its width, are equal 2:3, 3:5 or to the same proportions as the national flag of any country in which the UN flag is flown. The olive branches are a symbol for peace, and the world map represents all the people and the countries of the world.

The emblem design was officially adopted on 7 December 1946, and the flag, on 20 October 1947.

=== World Service Authority ===
The flag of the World Service Authority

The World Service Authority is a non-profit organization that claims to educate about and promote "world citizenship", "world law", and world government. It is best known for selling unofficial fictitious documents such as World Passports. It was founded in 1953 by Garry Davis. Its flag consists of the organization's emblem on a yellow background. The emblem depicts a white globe, with green outline, and green lines of the latitude and longitude. Within the globe stands a green figure of a human, reaching with its limbs to the boundaries of the globe.

=== Olympic Games ===
The current flag of the International Olympic Committee, responsible for the Olympic Games, used since 2010

The Olympic Games are the leading international sporting events featuring summer and winter sports competitions in which thousands of athletes from around the world participate in a variety of competitions. They are considered the world's foremost sports competition with more than 200 teams, representing sovereign states and territories, participating. The Olympic Games are organized by the International Olympic Committee, a non-governmental sports governing body, founded in 1894.

The Olympic flag depicts five interlocking rings, coloured blue, yellow, black, green, and red on a white field. The number of rings represent the five inhabited continents: Europe, Asia, Africa, Oceania, and the Americas, while the six colours were chosen, as each of the colours appears at least once in the flags of every sovereign state on the world. The flag proportions of the aspect ratio of the flag height to its width, are equal 2:3.

The symbol was originally created in 1913 by Pierre de Coubertin, co-founder of the International Olympic Committee. It was adopted in 1913, and first hoisted in 1914. It officially debuted at the 1920 Summer Olympics in Antwerp, and gained popularity and widespread use during the lead-up to the 1936 Summer Olympics in Berlin.

The design of the rings was slightly altered in 1988, and again in 2010.

=== League of Nations ===
The semi-official flag of the League of Nations

The League of Nations was the first worldwide intergovernmental organization whose principal mission was to maintain world peace. It was founded on 10 January 1920 by the Paris Peace Conference that ended World War I. The main organization ceased operations on 20 April 1946 but many of its components were relocated into the new United Nations.

The semi-official flag of the League of Nations was created in 1939. It features the organization emblem on the white background, placed in the centre. The emblem consists of a blue pentagon, with a white five-pointed star within it, with each of its points touching its vertices, and a white five-pointed star placed within the other star, that does not touches its sides. It symbolized five inhabited continents, and "five human races". Above the pentagon is a text written in capital blue letters that reads "League of Nations", while below the pentagon, is text written in the same style, that "Société des Nations". They are written respectively in English and French, two co-official languages of the League of Nations.

== In science fiction ==
=== Star Trek ===
The flag of the United Earth from Star Trek: Enterprise

In Star Trek science fiction media franchise created by Gene Roddenberry, Earth is governed by a single world government, the United Earth, which itself is a founding member of the United Federation of Planets.

In 1991 Star Trek VI: The Undiscovered Country film, set in the year 2293, the flag of the United Earth consists of two equally-sized horizontal stripes, of red and blue colour, with an equilateral triangle at the hoist. Within the white triangle is placed the emblem that features a planet, and rising sun behind it, placed within the light blue circle. It depicts the top half of the globe, placed in the bottom portion of the emblem. The planet includes a coordinate grid, and fictional white landmasses. Behind the globe is depicted a top half of a yellow sixteen-pointed star rising over the planet.

In the fourth season of the 2001 Star Trek: Enterprise television series, set in the year 2154, the flag of the United Earth depicts an emblem that includes a circle depicting a map of the world, centred on the prime meridian, and one olive branch placed to the left of the map. The boundary of the circle, landmasses and the branch are colour in golden colour, while the water on the map, in dark blue. The emblem is placed on the white background, slightly off-center to the right. Above and below the emblem are two thin horizontal lines, that consist of small parallelogram placed next to each other. The flag and emblem appears in the episodes "Home", "The Forge", and "Demons". The emblem also appears in the 2020 Star Trek: Lower Decks animated television series, in the episode "An Embarrassment of Dooplers".

In the first season of the 2017 Star Trek: Discovery television series, set in the year 2257, the flag of the United Earth consist of the emblem placed on the dark blue background. The emblem includes a circle depicting a map of the world, centred on the Atlantic Ocean, and one olive branch placed to the left of the map. The boundary of the circle, landmasses and the branch are colour in golden colour, while the water on the map, in dark blue. The flag appears in the episode "Will You Take My Hand?".

In the fourth season of Star Trek: Discovery, set in the year 3190, the Solar System is united under the government of the United Earth and Titan. Its emblem consists of the grey circle with beige boundary. On its right, there are two white circles, placed on the circular lines, symbolizing the two words in the orbits around the Sun, represented in the emblem as a golden half-circle in the top left corner of the emblem. Such emblem appears in the episodes "…But to Connect", and "Coming Home". The alternative version of the emblem shown in the episode "Coming Home" depicts a circle with three smaller circles within it. It includes a circle placed to the right includes a map of the world, centred on the Atlantic Ocean, and two smaller circles placed to its right.

In the second season of the 2020 Star Trek: Picard television series, set in the year 2401, the flag of the United Earth consist of the emblem placed on the white background. The emblem includes a circle depicting a map of the world, centred on the Atlantic Ocean, and one olive branch placed to the left of the map. The boundary of the circle, landmasses and the branch are colour in golden colour, while the water on the map, in dark blue.

=== Mobile Suit Gundam ===
The flag of the Earth Federation from Mobile Suit Gundam

In the 1979 anime Mobile Suit Gundam, the flag of the Earth Federation is depicted as a dark blue banner with golden rhombus , a light blue globe in its center with yellow triangles around it.

=== Futurama ===
The flag of the Government of Earth, in the Futurama television series

In the 1999 Futurama science fiction comedy television series, set in the 3000s, the Earth is united under a world government. Its flag contains thirteen horizontal stripes, alternating between red and white, with a blue canton in the left top corner, containing a globe, with the Americas prominently depicted in the centre. It was based on the flag of the United States. Its aspect ratio of the height of the flag to its width equals 10:19. The flag appeared for the first time in the episode "When Aliens Attack", and was prominently featured in the episode "A Taste of Freedom", where it was named the "Old Freebie". A variant of the flag based on the First Navy Jack is also seen in "When Aliens Attack".

=== The Expanse ===
The flag of the United Nations from The Expanse

In the 2015 science fiction television series The Expanse, set in the 24th century, the Earth, Moon and several colonies across the Solar System are governed by the United Nations which had assumed the role of a united world government.

Its flag is a modified version of the current flag of the United Nations, consisting of a white emblem and text placed in the centre, on a dark blue background. The emblem includes a simplified and stylized azimuthal equidistant projection of the world map centred on the North Pole, with the globe bisected in the centre by the Prime Meridian and the International Date Line. The projection of the map includes four concentric circles and extends from the North polar region (shown clear of meridian lines and icecap) to 60 degrees south latitude. Around the map is placed a circle, with eight smaller circles evenly distributed around its circumference, symbolizing the lunar phase ordered (from the top clockwise) from the first quarter through to the waxing gibbous phase.

The elements are inscribed in a wreath consisting of crossed conventionalized branches of the olive tree, which are inscribed within two rows of circular lines, cut vertically in the middle. Above the map, between the space left by the lines, are three five-pointed stars, with the middle one placed higher than the remaining two. Below the emblem is inscribed text in white capital letters, that reads "United Nations".

The flag of Super Earth from Helldivers 2

=== Helldivers 2 ===
In the 2024 science fiction video game Helldivers 2, set in the 22nd century, Super Earth is the sole world government after "having emerged victorious against its adversaries, the deadly, bug-like Terminids". Its flag features a white flat map projection of Earth surrounded by two yellow wreaths, seven white stars arranged below the wreaths, and towers on top of the Earth over a blue background. In-game, the flag is part of a usable weapon called the CQC-1 One True Flag, a spear-like weapon used to attack enemies.

== See also ==
- Cosmopolitanism, an idea that all human beings are members of a single community
- Earth symbol, an astronomical symbol for the planet Earth
- Earth anthem, a theoretical song that would represent Earth
- Flag of Mars, a flag design that could represent the planet Mars
