= Global citizenship =

Idea that all people have rights and responsibilities from being a member of the world

Global citizenship is a form of transnationality, specifically the idea that one's identity transcends geography or political borders and that responsibilities or rights are derived from membership in a broader global class of "humanity". This does not mean that such a person denounces or waives their nationality or other, more local identities, but that such identities are given "second place" to their membership in a global community. Extended, the idea leads to questions about the state of global society in the age of globalization.

In general usage, the term may have much the same meaning as "world citizen" or cosmopolitan, but it also has additional, specialized meanings in differing contexts. Various organizations, such as the World Service Authority, have advocated global transnational citizenship.

The field of global citizenship, as a form of transnationality is transnationalism.

== Usage ==
=== Education ===
Global Citizenship youth work project in Wales, 2016

In education, the term is most often used to describe a worldview or a set of values toward which education is oriented (see, for example, the priorities of the Global Education First Initiative led by the Secretary-General of the United Nations). The term "global society" is sometimes used to indicate a global studies set of learning objectives for students to prepare them for global citizenship (see, for example, the Global Studies Center at the University of Pittsburgh).

==== Global citizenship education ====
Within the educational system, the concept of global citizenship education (GCED) is beginning to supersede or overarch movements such as multicultural education, peace education, human rights education, Education for Sustainable Development, and international education. Additionally, GCED rapidly incorporates references to the aforementioned movements. However, most global citizenship programmes do not explicitly link their specific activities to their intended outcomes, which limits robust outcome assessment of these education programmes. The concept of global citizenship has been linked with awards offered for helping humanity. Teachers are being given the responsibility of being social change agents. Audrey Osler, director of the Centre for Citizenship and Human Rights Education, the University of Leeds, affirms that "Education for living together in an interdependent world is not an optional extra, but an essential foundation".

With GCED gaining attention, scholars are investigating the field and developing perspectives. The following are a few of the more common perspectives:

- Critical and transformative perspective. Citizenship is defined by being a member with rights and responsibilities. Therefore, GCED must encourage active involvement. GCED can be taught from a critical and transformative perspective, whereby students are thinking, feeling, and doing. In this approach, GCED requires students to be politically critical and personally transformative. Teachers provide social issues in a neutral and grade-appropriate way for students to understand, grapple with, and do something about.
- Worldmindedness. Graham Pike and David Selby view GCED as having two strands. Worldmindedness, the first strand, refers to understanding the world as one unified system and a responsibility to view the interests of individual nations with the overall needs of the planet in mind. The second strand, Child-centeredness, is a pedagogical approach that encourages students to explore and discover on their own and addresses each learner as an individual with inimitable beliefs, experiences, and talents.
- Holistic Understanding. The Holistic Understanding perspective was founded by Merry Merryfield, focusing on understanding the self in relation to a global community. This perspective follows a curriculum that attends to human values and beliefs, global systems, issues, history, cross-cultural understandings, and the development of analytical and evaluative skills.

=== Philosophy ===
Global citizenship, in some contexts, may refer to a brand of ethics or political philosophy in which it is proposed that the core social, political, economic, and environmental realities of the world today should be addressed at all levels—by individuals, civil society organizations, communities, and nation states—through a global lens. It refers to a broad, culturally and environmentally inclusive worldview that accepts the fundamental interconnectedness of all things. Political, geographic borders become irrelevant and solutions to today's challenges are seen to be beyond the narrow vision of national interests. Proponents of this philosophy often point to Diogenes of Sinope (c. 412 B.C.) as an example, given his reported declaration that "I am a citizen of the world (κοσμοπολίτης, cosmopolites)" in response to a question about his place of origin. A Tamil term, Yadhum oore yaavarum kelir, has the meaning of "the world is one family". The statement is not just about peace and harmony among the societies in the world, but also about a truth that somehow the whole world has to live together like a family.

=== Psychological studies ===
Global pollsters and psychologists have studied individual differences in the sense of global citizenship. Beginning in 2005, the World Values Survey (WVS), administered across almost 100 countries, included the statement, "I see myself as a world citizen". In the WVS Wave 6, conducted from 2010 to 2014, across the globe 29.5% "strongly agreed" and another 41% "agreed" with this statement. However, there were wide national variations, as 71% of citizens of Qatar, 21% of U.S. citizens, 16% of Chinese, and just 11% of Palestinians "strongly agreed". Interpreting these differences is difficult, however, as survey methods varied for different countries, and the connotations of "world citizen" differ in different languages and cultures.

For smaller studies, several multi-item scales have been developed, including Sam McFarland and colleagues' Identification with All Humanity scale (e.g., "How much do you identify with (that is, feel a part of, feel love toward, have concern for) ... all humans everywhere?"), Anna Malsch and Alan Omoto's Psychological Sense of Global Community (e.g., "I feel a sense of connection to people all over the world, even if I don't know them personally"), Gerhard Reese and colleagues' Global Social Identity scale (e.g., "I feel strongly connected to the world community as a whole"), and Stephen Reysen and Katzarska-Miller's global citizenship identification scale (e.g., "I strongly identify with global citizens"). These measures are strongly related to one another, but they are not fully identical.

Studies of the psychological roots of global citizenship have found that persons high in global citizenship are also high on the personality traits of openness to experience and agreeableness from the Big Five personality traits and high in empathy and caring. Oppositely, the authoritarian personality, the social dominance orientation, and psychopathy are all associated with less global human identification. Some of these traits are influenced by heredity as well as by early experiences, which, in turn, likely influence individuals' receptiveness to global human identification.

Research has found that those who are high in global human identification are less prejudiced toward many groups, care more about international human rights, worldwide inequality, global poverty and human suffering. They attend more actively to global concerns, value the lives of all human beings more equally, and give more in time and money to international humanitarian causes. They tend to be more politically liberal on both domestic and international issues. They want their countries to do more to alleviate global suffering.

Following a social identity approach, Reysen and Katzarska-Miller tested a model showing the antecedents and outcomes of global citizenship identification (i.e., degree of psychological connection with global citizens). Individuals' normative environment (the cultural environment in which one is embedded contains people, artifacts, cultural patterns that promote viewing the self as a global citizen) and global awareness (perceiving oneself as aware, knowledgeable, and connected to others in the world) predict global citizenship identification. Global citizenship identification then predicts six broad categories of prosocial behaviors and values, including: intergroup empathy, valuing diversity, social justice, environmental sustainability, intergroup helping, and a felt responsibility to act. Subsequent research has examined variables that influence the model such as: participation in a college course with global components, perception of one's global knowledge, college professors' attitudes toward global citizenship, belief in an intentional worlds view of culture, participation in a fan group that promotes the identity, use of global citizen related words when describing one's values, possible self as a global citizen, religiosity and religious orientation, threat to one's nation, interdependent self-construal prime, perception of the university environment, and social media usage.

In 2019, a review of all studies of the psychology of global human identification and citizenship through 2018 was published.

== Aspects ==
=== Geography, sovereignty, and citizenship ===
At the same time that globalization is reducing the importance of nation-states, the idea of global citizenship may require a redefinition of ties between civic engagement and geography. Face-to-face town hall meetings seem increasingly supplanted by electronic "town halls" not limited by space and time. Absentee ballots opened the way for expatriates to vote while living in another country; the Internet may carry this several steps further. Another interpretation given by several scholars of the changing configurations of citizenship due to globalization is the possibility that citizenship becomes a changed institution; even if situated within territorial boundaries that are national, if the meaning of the national itself has changed, then the meaning of being a citizen of that nation changes.

=== Human rights ===
The lack of a universally recognized world body can put the initiative upon global citizens themselves to create rights and obligations. Rights and obligations as they arose at the formation of nation-states (e.g. the right to vote and obligation to serve in time of war) are being expanded. Thus, new concepts that accord certain "human rights" which arose in the 20th century are increasingly being universalized across nations and governments. This is the result of many factors, including the Universal Declaration of Human Rights by the United Nations in 1948, the aftermath of World War II and the Holocaust and growing sentiments towards legitimizing marginalized peoples (e.g., pre-industrialized peoples found in the jungles of Brazil and Borneo). Couple this with growing awareness of our impact on the environment, and there is the rising feeling that citizen rights may extend to include the right to dignity and self-determination. If national citizenship does not foster these new rights, then global citizenship may seem more accessible.

Global citizenship advocates may confer specific rights and obligations of human beings trapped in conflicts, those incarcerated as part of ethnic cleansing, and pre-industrialized tribes newly discovered by scientists living in the depths of dense jungle.

==== UN General Assembly ====
On 10 December 1948, the UN General Assembly Adopted Resolution 217A (III), also known as "The Universal Declaration of Human Rights".

Article 1 states that "All human beings are born free and equal in dignity and rights. They are endowed with reason and conscience and should act towards one another in a spirit of brotherhood."

Article 2 states that "Everyone is entitled to all the rights and freedoms set forth in this Declaration, without distinction of any kind, such as race, colour, sex, language, religion, political or other opinions, national or social origin, property, birth or other status. Furthermore, no distinction shall be made on the basis of the political, jurisdictional or international status of the country or territory to which a person belongs, whether it be independent, trust, non-self-governing or under any other limitation of sovereignty."

Article 13(2) states that "Everyone has the right to leave any country, including his own, and to return to his country."

As evidence in today's modern world, events such as the Trial of Saddam Hussein have proven what British jurist A. V. Dicey said in 1885, when he popularized the phrase "rule of law" in 1885. Dicey emphasized three aspects of the rule of law :

1. No one can be punished or made to suffer except for a breach of law proved in an ordinary court.
2. No one is above the law and everyone is equal before the law regardless of social, economic, or political status.
3. The rule of law includes the results of judicial decisions determining the rights of private persons.

==== US Declaration of Independence ====
The opening of the United States Declaration of Independence, written by Thomas Jefferson in 1776, states as follows:

We hold these truths to be self-evident, that all men are created equal, that they are endowed by their Creator with certain unalienable Rights, that among these are Life, Liberty, and the Pursuit of Happiness. That to secure these rights, Governments are instituted among Men, deriving their just powers from the consent of the governed;

"Global citizenship in the United States" was a term used by former U.S. President Barack Obama in 2008 in a speech in Berlin.

== Social movements ==
=== World citizen ===
World Citizen flag by Garry Davis

World Citizen badge

In general, a world citizen is a person who places global citizenship above any nationalistic or local identities and relationships. An early expression of this value is found in Diogenes of Sinope (c. 412 B.C.; mentioned above), a Cynic philosopher in Ancient Greece. Of Diogenes it is said: "Asked where he came from, he answered: 'I am a citizen of the world (kosmopolitês)'". This was a ground-breaking concept because the broadest basis of social identity in Greece at that time was either the individual city-state or the Greeks (Hellenes) as a group. The Tamil poet Kaniyan Poongundran wrote in Purananuru, "To us all towns are one, all men our kin." In later years, political philosopher Thomas Paine would declare, "my country is the world, and my religion is to do good." Today, the increase in worldwide globalization has led to the formation of a "world citizen" social movement under a proposed world government. In a non-political definition, it has been suggested that a world citizen may provide value to society by using knowledge acquired across cultural contexts. Many people also consider themselves world citizens, as they feel at home wherever they may go.

Albert Einstein described himself as a world citizen and supported the idea throughout his life, famously saying "Nationalism is an infantile disease. It is the measles of mankind." World citizenship has been promoted by distinguished people including Garry Davis, who lived for 60 years as a citizen of no nation, only the world. In 1953 Davis founded the World Service Authority in Washington, DC, which sells World Passports, a fantasy passport to world citizens. In 1956 Hugh J. Schonfield founded the Commonwealth of World Citizens, later known by its Esperanto name "Mondcivitana Respubliko", which also issued a world passport; it declined after the 1980s.

The Baháʼí Faith promotes the concept through its founder's proclamation (in the late 19th century) that "The Earth is but one country, and mankind its citizens." As a term defined by the Baháʼí International Community in a concept paper shared at the 1st session of the United Nations Commission on Sustainable Development, New York, U.S.A. on 14–25 June 1993. "World citizenship begins with an acceptance of the oneness of the human family and the interconnectedness of the nations of 'the earth, our home.' While it encourages a sane and legitimate patriotism, it also insists upon a wider loyalty, a love of humanity as a whole. It does not, however, imply abandonment of legitimate loyalties, the suppression of cultural diversity, the abolition of national autonomy, nor the imposition of uniformity. Its hallmark is 'unity in diversity.' World citizenship encompasses the principles of social and economic justice, both within and between nations; non-adversarial decision making at all levels of society; equality of the sexes; racial, ethnic, national and religious harmony; and the willingness to sacrifice for the common good. Other facets of world citizenship—including the promotion of human honour and dignity, understanding, amity, co-operation, trustworthiness, compassion and the desire to serve—can be deduced from those already mentioned."

=== Mundialization ===
Philosophically, mundialization (French, mondialisation) is seen as a response to globalization's "dehumanisation through [despatialised] planetarisation" (Teilhard de Chardin quoted in Capdepuy 2011). An early use of mondialisation was to refer to the act of a city or a local authority declaring itself a "world citizen" city, by voting a charter stating its awareness of global problems and its sense of shared responsibility. The concept was promoted by the self-declared World Citizen Garry Davis in 1949, as a logical extension of the idea of individuals declaring themselves world citizens, and promoted by Robert Sarrazac, a former leader of the French Resistance who created the Human Front of World Citizens in 1945.

The first city to be officially mundialised was the small French city of Cahors (only 20,000 in 2006), the capital city of the Département of Lot in central France, on 20 July 1949. Hundreds of cities mundialised themselves over a few years, most of them in France, and then it spread internationally, including to many German cities and to Hiroshima and Nagasaki. In less than a year, ten General Councils (the elected councils of the French "Départements"), and hundreds of cities in France covering 3.4 million inhabitants voted mundialisation charters. One of the goals was to elect one delegate per million inhabitants to a People's World Constitutional Convention given the already then historical failure of the United Nations in creating a global institution able to negotiate a final world peace. More than 1,000 cities and towns have declared themselves World cities, including Beverly Hills, Los Angeles, Minneapolis, St. Louis, Philadelphia, Toronto, Hiroshima, Tokyo, Nivelles, and Königswinter.

As a social movement, mundialization expresses the solidarity of populations of the globe and aims to establish institutions and supranational laws of a federative structure common to them, while respecting the diversity of cultures and peoples. The movement advocates for a new political organization governing all humanity, involving the transfer of certain parts of national sovereignty to a Federal World Authority, Federal World Government and Federal World Court. Basing its authority on the will of the people, supporters hope it could develop new systems to draw on the highest and best wisdom of all humanity, and solve major planetary problems like hunger, access to water, war, peace-keeping, pollution and energy. The mundialization movement includes the declaration of specified territory – a city, town, or state, for example – as world territory, with responsibilities and rights on a world scale. Currently, the nation-state system and the United Nations offer no way for the people of the world to vote for world officials or participate in governing our world. International treaties or agreements, while binding at the international level, are not automatically enforceable under the laws of every state. Mundialization seeks to address this lack by presenting a way to build, one city at a time, such a system of true World Law based upon the sovereignty of the whole.

=== Earth Anthem ===
Author-politician Shashi Tharoor feels that an Earth Anthem sung by people across the world can inspire planetary consciousness and global citizenship among people.

== Criticisms ==
Not all interpretations of global citizenship are positive. For example, Bhikhu Chotalal Parekh advocates what he calls globally oriented citizenship, and states, "If global citizenship means being a citizen of the world, it is neither practicable nor desirable." He argues that global citizenship, defined as an actual membership of a type of worldwide government system, is impractical and dislocated from one's immediate community. He also notes that such a world state would inevitably be "remote, bureaucratic, oppressive, and culturally bland." Parekh presents his alternative option with the statement: "Since the conditions of life of our fellow human beings in distant parts of the world should be a matter of deep moral and political concern to us, our citizenship has an inescapable global dimension, and we should aim to become what I might call a globally oriented citizen." Parekh's concept of globally oriented citizenship consists of identifying with and strengthening ties towards one's political regional community (whether in its current state or an improved, revised form), while recognizing and acting upon obligations towards others in the rest of the world.

Michael Byers, a professor in Political Science at the University of British Columbia, questions the assumption that there is one definition of global citizenship, and unpacks aspects of potential definitions. In the introduction to his public lecture, the UBC Internationalization website states, "'Global citizenship' remains undefined. What, if anything, does it really mean? Is global citizenship just the latest buzzword?" Byers notes the existence of stateless persons, whom he remarks ought to be the primary candidates for global citizenship, yet continue to live without access to basic freedoms and citizenship rights. Byers does not oppose the concept of global citizenship, however, he criticizes potential implications of the term depending on one's definition of it, such as ones that provide support for the "ruthlessly capitalist economic system that now dominates the planet." Byers states that global citizenship is a "powerful term" because "people that invoke it do so to provoke and justify action," and encourages the attendees of his lecture to re-appropriate it in order for its meaning to have a positive purpose, based on idealistic values.

Neither criticism of global citizenship is anything new. Gouverneur Morris, a delegate to the Constitutional Convention (United States), criticized "citizens of the world" while he was on the floor of the convention on 9 August 1787:

As to those philosophical gentlemen, those Citizens of the World as they call themselves, He owned he did not wish to see any of them in our public Councils. He would not trust them. The men who can shake off their attachments to their own Country can never love any other. These attachments are the wholesome prejudices which uphold all Governments, Admit a Frenchman into your Senate, and he will study to increase the commerce of France: an Englishman, and he will feel an equal bias in favor of that of England.

== See also ==
- Alliance for Responsible Citizenship
- Alter-globalisation
- Anti-patriotism
- Cosmopolitanism
- Global civics
- Global Citizens Movement
- Global democracy (disambiguation)
- Global governance
- Global justice
- Globality
- Netizen
- Open borders
- Earth anthem
- Postnationalism
- Subsidiarity
- Spaceship Earth
- Think globally, act locally
- Transnationalism
- United Nations Day
- World community
- Global union
- World Constitution and Parliament Association
