= Henry Noel =

Henry Noel may refer to:

- Henry Noel (courtier) (died 1597), Elizabethan courtier and member of parliament for Morpeth, and for Cricklade
- Henry Noel (MP for Stamford) (1642–1677), member of parliament for Stamford
- Henry Noel, 6th Earl of Gainsborough (1743–1798), English peer
- Henry Martyn Noel (fl. 1940s), American peace activist in Allied-occupied Germany
- Henry Noel (American politician), American politician, member of the New Hampshire House of Representatives
