= OPEN Fest Sarajevo =

Annual international gathering for libertarians

- Genre: liberalism
- Dates: January
- Locations: Sarajevo, Bosnia and Herzegovina
- Years active: 2016 – 2017

OPEN Fest Sarajevo was the largest libertarian festival in Europe. Its two editions were held in Sarajevo, Bosnia and Herzegovina in 2016 and 2017. It was dedicated to the promotion of ideas of liberty and human rights. Furthermore, it promoted economic and political freedoms, together with the fundamental rights of the individual. The festival was established by the Multi Group in cooperation with the Atlas Network, Students for Liberty and the Rising Tide Foundation. The first edition of the festival hosted over 10,000 guests, 50 NGO's and 40 international speakers.

== History and format ==
The festival was held in January and lasted for 5 days. It hosted a large conference and lecture program that focused on the promotion of economic and political freedoms. Subjects that were treated include the free market, entrepreneurship, cryptocurrency, technology, legalisation of cannabis, and Objectivism. The festival hosted film screenings, economics workshops and an entertainment program that included concerts and afterparties. Guests and speakers included FreedomWorks president and Tea Party leader Matt Kibbe, Bitnation founder Susanne Tarkowski Tempelhof, Iranian-Swedish author Nima Sanandaji, anarcho-capitalist economist and son of Milton Friedman, David D. Friedman, president of the University of the Philippines Alfredo Pascual, British journalist and research fellow at the Institute of Economic Affairs, Christopher Snowden and others.
