= Glen T. Martin =

American philosopher (born 1944)

Glen Martin
- Born: Glen Theron Martin; 1944 (age 81–82)

Education
- Education: University at Buffalo (BA); Hunter College (MA); Graduate Center, CUNY (PhD)
- Thesis: The Transformation of Nihilism: A Study of Metaphysical Truth in Nietzsche and Wittgenstein (1985)

Philosophical work
- Era: Contemporary philosophy
- Region: Western philosophy
- Institutions: Radford University
- Main interests: Political philosophy; peace studies; ethics; global democracy; world federalism
- Notable works: From Nietzsche to Wittgenstein (1989); The Global Democracy (1997, with Hans Schumann); Global Democracy and Human Self-Transcendence (2018); The Earth Constitution Solution (2021)

Glen Theron Martin (born 1944) is an American philosopher, writer, and professor emeritus of philosophy at Radford University. His published work has ranged from studies of Friedrich Nietzsche and Ludwig Wittgenstein to books and essays on peace studies, global democracy, democratic world law, and the Constitution for the Federation of Earth.

== Early life and education ==
Martin was born in 1944. He studied philosophy at the University at Buffalo, Hunter College, and the Graduate Center, CUNY. His doctoral dissertation, completed in 1985, was titled The Transformation of Nihilism: A Study of Metaphysical Truth in Nietzsche and Wittgenstein.

== Career ==
Martin taught in the Department of Philosophy and Religious Studies at Radford University and later became professor emeritus. He was also associated with the university's peace studies curriculum.

Martin advocates for a democratic world federalism and is affiliated with the World Constitution and Parliament Association and the Earth Constitution Institute.

== Philosophy and writing ==
Martin's early scholarly work focused on questions of truth, nihilism, and language in modern philosophy. His 1989 book From Nietzsche to Wittgenstein presents Nietzsche as diagnosing the nihilism of modernity and Wittgenstein as offering a way beyond it. Related articles from this period include A Critique of Nietzsche's Metaphysical Scepticism (1987) and The Religious Nature of Wittgenstein's Later Philosophy (1988).

In later work, Martin turned increasingly toward political philosophy, peace theory, and global governance. His books The Global Democracy, Ascent to Freedom, and Global Democracy and Human Self-Transcendence argue for forms of democratic world law and planetary political transformation. He has also written on sustainability and global constitutionalism in books such as The Anatomy of a Sustainable World and The Earth Constitution Solution.

== Selected works ==
- From Nietzsche to Wittgenstein: The Problem of Truth and Nihilism in the Modern World (1989)
- The Global Democracy (1997, with Hans Schumann)
- Millennium Dawn: The Philosophy of Planetary Crisis and Human Liberation (2005)
- Ascent to Freedom: Practical and Philosophical Foundations of Democratic World Law (2008)
- A Constitution for the Federation of Earth: With Historical Introduction, Commentary and Conclusion (2010)
- One World Renaissance: Holistic Planetary Transformation through a Global Social Contract (2016)
- Global Democracy and Human Self-Transcendence: The Power of the Future for Planetary Transformation (2018)
- The Earth Constitution Solution: Design for a Living Planet (2021)
