= Garry Davis =

Peace activist and world federalist (1921–2013)

- Born: Sol Gareth Davis; 27 July 1921; Bar Harbor, Maine, U.S.
- Died: 24 July 2013 (aged 91); South Burlington, Vermont, U.S.
- Citizenship: United States (1921–1948); Stateless (1948–2013)
- Education: Carnegie Mellon University; East West University
- Occupations: Peace and world citizenship activist
- Organizations: International Registry of World Citizens; World Service Authority
- Known for: Popularizing world citizenship World Passport
- Spouse: Esther Peter (m. 1963; div. 1975)
- Children: Kristina Starr Davis; Troy Davis; Athena Davis; Kim Davis

Sol Gareth "Garry" Davis (27 July 1921 – 24 July 2013) was an international peace activist best known for renouncing his American citizenship and interrupting the United Nations in 1948 to advocate for world government as a way to end nationalistic wars.

Davis renounced his citizenship of the United States in May 1948 at the American Embassy in Paris, France, declaring himself instead a citizen of the world.

Davis, a World Federalist, founded the non-profit World Service Authority in 1953 to educate and promote World government. The World Service Authority issues "world government documents", such as the World Passport, a fantasy travel document based on his interpretation of Article 13(2), Universal Declaration of Human Rights, and the concept of world citizenship. Previously, Davis had worked as a Broadway stage actor and understudy for Danny Kaye. He served as an American bomber pilot in World War II.

== Early life and education ==
Davis was born in Bar Harbor, Maine, to Meyer and Hilda (née Hodgkins) Davis. His parents were Jewish and Irish, respectively. He graduated from The Episcopal Academy in 1940 and attended the Carnegie Institute of Technology (now Carnegie Mellon University).

== Career ==
Davis was a Broadway actor who served as understudy for Danny Kaye and performed for him in the musical Let's Face It! He also played a leading role in the Broadway hit Three to Make Ready.

Davis served in the U.S. Army during the Second World War as B-17 bomber pilot.

== Advocacy for world government ==
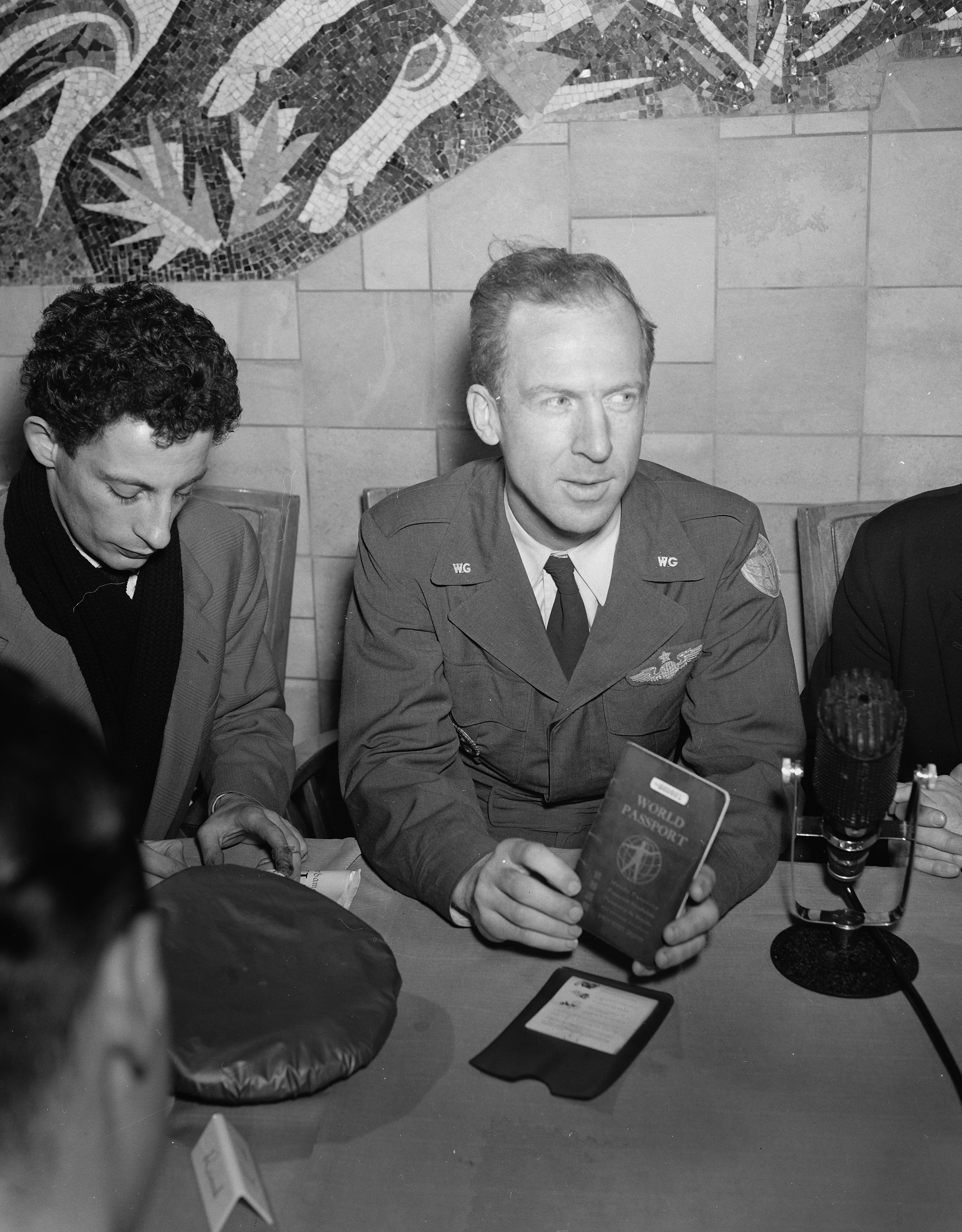
Garry Davis with his World Passport (January 9, 1957).

Pained by his own brother's war death and the death he caused other families by bombing the city of Brandenburg an der Havel in World War II, and fearful that nuclear war could terminate humanity, Davis's relinquishment of United States nationality in 1948 led him to declare himself a "citizen of the world". He mentioned Henry Martyn Noel, who had renounced a few months earlier, as one of his inspirations.

In France, his "Garry Davis Council of Solidarity" support committee was co-founded by writers Albert Camus, André Breton, and Claude Bourdet, and Emmaus movement originator Abbé Pierre, as well as Robert Sarrazac, a former leader of the French Résistance who joined Davis in founding the World Citizens movement. Davis interrupted a United Nations General Assembly session on 19 November 1948, "We, the people, want the peace which only a world government can give," he proclaimed. "The sovereign states you represent divide us and lead us to the abyss of total war." Along with his support committee, he rallied over 15,000 people in Paris to demand that the UN recognize the rights of Humanity. In her My Day column, Eleanor Roosevelt ridiculed his stunts as "flash-in-the-pan publicity."

Davis founded the International Registry of World Citizens in Paris in January 1949, registering over 750,000 individuals. On September 4, 1953, Davis formed an organisation, the World Government of World Citizens, with the stated aim of furthering fundamental human rights.

He additionally formed the World Service Authority in 1954 as the government's executive and administrative agency, which issues its own fantasy passports – along with fantasy birth and other certificates – to customers. Davis first used his World Passport on a trip to India in 1956 and was allegedly admitted into some countries using it.

Davis ran for mayor in Washington, D.C., in 1986 as the "World Citizen Party" candidate, receiving 585 votes. He also declared himself the World Citizen Party candidate for the 1988 US presidential election. Davis published multiple books in favor of his cause of world citizenship.

At the 1992 Earth Summit in Rio de Janeiro, Davis issued and disbursed a world currency based on kilowatt-hours of solar power produced, an idea proposed by Buckminster Fuller. These "kilowatt dollars" were the earliest documented emissions reduction currency.

In March 2012, at age 90, Davis began broadcasting a weekly radio show, "World Citizen Radio", on the Global Radio Alliance.

== Attempts to help Julian Assange and Edward Snowden ==
In 2012, Davis sent WikiLeaks founder Julian Assange a World Passport. Only weeks before he died, Davis sent a World Passport to whistleblower Edward Snowden in Moscow in care of the Russian authorities.

== Death ==
Davis entered hospice care on 18 July 2013, and died six days later in the municipality of South Burlington, Vermont, three days shy of his 92nd birthday. He was survived by a daughter from his first marriage, Kristina Starr Davis; two sons, Troy and Kim; and a daughter, Athena Davis from his third marriage; as well as two siblings and a granddaughter.

== Critics ==
The German History advisor Julian Pastor challenged the legitimacy of Davis' claimed Master's from an East-West University.

== Bibliography ==
- Davis, Garry (1961). My Country Is the world: The Adventures of a World Citizen. Putnam.
- Davis, Garry (1992). Passport to Freedom, A Guide for World Citizens. Nwo Pubns. ISBN 0-929765-08-7
- Davis, Garry (2003). World Government, Ready or Not!. BookSurge Publishing. ISBN 1-59457-166-X
- Davis, Garry (2004). Letters to World Citizens. BookSurge Publishing. ISBN 0-9706483-7-5
- Davis, Garry (2001). A World Citizen in the Holy Land. World Government House. ISBN 0-9706483-4-0
- Davis, Garry (2005). Cher monde, une odyssée a travers la planete. World Government House. ISBN 0-9706483-9-1
- Davis, Garry (2006). Dear World: A Global Odyssey. BookSurge Publishing. ISBN 0-7388-2624-3
