= Henry Martyn Noel =

American-born stateless chemical engineer

Henry Martyn Noel Jr.
- Born: May 21, 1923; Elizabeth, New Jersey, U.S.
- Died: June 14, 1995 (aged 72); USA
- Occupation: Chemical engineer
- Known for: Activist; voluntary statelessness
- Spouse: Cecile Francoise Gillet De Thorey (m. 1961)

Henry Martyn Noel Jr. was a former American citizen who moved to Allied-occupied Germany in the aftermath of World War II and voluntarily made himself stateless in order to protest "a climax of nationalism" he saw rising around him in the United States. His actions inspired Garry Davis to follow a similar course.

== Early life ==
Noel was born in Elizabeth, New Jersey to Henry Martyn Noel and Dorothy (née Lawson) Noel. Henry Sr. was a native of Missouri, and served with the 103rd Infantry Division in World War I. He later became a chemical engineer at Standard Oil's Bayway Refinery in Elizabeth, New Jersey.

Henry Noel Jr. attended the New Hampton School in New Hampton, New Hampshire, followed by Harvard University (beginning 1940), where he studied philosophy. His major influences there included professors such as Alfred North Whitehead and Raphael Demos. However, after the outbreak of World War II, Noel and his friends became increasingly disturbed over what was happening in the world; Noel's unease culminated with his withdrawal from the school in 1943. He was living in East Andover, New Hampshire at the time of his enlistment.

== Travels and renunciation ==
After his withdrawal from Harvard, Noel, unable to enlist in the Army due to his poor eyesight, joined the Friends' Ambulance Unit as an ambulance driver, in which capacity he served in India and Italy. Noel arrived in Germany in September 1947 after working for American Aid to France, Inc., in Paris and in the field. He found work with a German construction firm at Kassel. He earned a wage of 25 marks per week, and lived in a tiny room with no electric light. He subsisted on German rations of 1,550 calories per day. In February 1948, he renounced his U.S. citizenship. By October, he had successfully integrated into his new home, and stated he felt "accepted" by the community there. However the following month, Noel was arrested by the French army in Neustadt, Baden.

== Reactions to renunciation ==
The Montreal Gazette described Noel's action as "a gesture bound to be in vain ... his personal error is in supposing that an individual protest of this nature can be effective".

Paul Gallico described Noel as part of a trend of "youthful U.S. citizens with bleeding hearts who renounce family ties, our way of life, and depart these shores to snuggle up to a gang of brutes".

In contrast, The Christian Science Monitor wrote a largely supportive editorial.

Garry Davis also described Noel as one of his inspirations for his own renunciation of citizenship and subsequent creation of the World Service Authority. Soon after Noel and Davis' renunciations, Arthur W. Taylor, an African-American from Chicago, also renounced his citizenship at the United States Embassy in Paris, making him the third former American to become stateless that year.

== Marriage ==
In 1961, he married Cecile Francoise Gillet De Thorey (born September 24, 1921, Paris – died March 20, 2008, Evreux, Eure, France).
