= Fantasy passport =

Novelty documentation

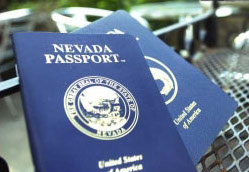
Nevada fantasy passport

Expo 67 passport

Fantasy passports are passport-like documents issued as novelties or souvenirs, to make a political statement or to show loyalty to a political or other cause, such as independence movements, as well as sovereign citizen, freemen on the land and redemptions movements. Souvenir United States state passports have also been issued, for Nevada or the Republic of Texas for instance, but these typically are clearly marked as novelties.

== Examples ==
- The Haudenosaunee Confederacy has issued the Haudenosaunee passport which its lacrosse team has attempted to use when participating in international competitions.
- Conch Republic passports. A micronation declared as a tongue-in-cheek protest secession of the city of Key West, Florida, from the US in 1982.
- Manchukuo passports. Issued by the Manchukuo Temporary Government
- Newfoundland passports. Found at various tourist shops to serve as souvenirs of Newfoundland and Labrador. These mark the distinct culture of the most eastern Canadian province and oldest place of European colonization in North America. They are also reminders that Newfoundland was once an independent British Colony of Newfoundland and Dominion of Newfoundland before joining Canada in 1949.
- Neue Slowenische Kunst passports. Issued by the non-territorial Slovenian art collective championed by the rock band Laibach.
- Republic of Taiwan passports. Issued by various groups supporting Taiwan independence. In 2001, a Los Angeles resident successfully obtained a Brazilian visa on such a passport, and used it to travel to Brazil. In news interviews, he stated that he faced no difficulties in entering the country, while in contrast a fellow traveller using a Republic of China passport was "heckled" by Brazilian officials, possibly because they confused it with a People's Republic of China passport and took the man to be mainland Chinese. Others claim to have successfully obtained Belizean residence permits on Republic of Taiwan passports.
- World Passport. According to the World Service Authority, was filed as a Machine Readable Travel Document (MRTD) with the International Civil Aviation Organization (ICAO). However, ICAO documents on MRTDs cite the World Service Authority and its passport as an example of "Fantasy Documents".
- Expo Passport. First introduced in Expo 67, Expo Passport is one of the most popular souvenirs in World Expos. Visitors can collect stamps on their passports while visiting pavilions.
- The International Parliament for Safety and Peace issued "diplomatic passports". The Council of the European Union, the authorities of Portugal and the Isle of Man, and various news sources have described these as fantasy documents.
- The Principality of Sealand previously sold fantasy passports for a total of around 22 years. In 1997, the Bates family revoked all Sealand passports, as it was uncovered that they were at the center of an international money laundering ring.

== See also ==
- Camouflage passport
