= Esther Peter-Davis =

French environmentalist (1932–2022)

- Born: Esther Peter; 11 September 1932; Strasbourg, France
- Died: 8 October 2022 (aged 90); Strasbourg, France
- Occupation: Human rights activist
- Spouse: Garry Davis (m. 1963; div. 1975)
- Children: 3

Esther Peter-Davis (11 September 1932 – 8 October 2022) was a French Alsatian pacifist who played a decisive role in the development of the anti-nuclear movement in France and the development of cross-border organizations for the defense of human rights and a healthy environment.

== Biography ==
Esther Peter was born in Strasbourg, France, on 11 September 1932. In 1963, she married Garry Davis, who founded the Citoyens du Monde (transl. "Citizens of the World") movement in 1948. They had met a year after he founded the organization, and she had been his secretary.

In 1960, Peter-Davis opposed military nuclear tests in the Sahara.

In 1970, she, Garry, and their three children lived 38 kilometres (24 mi), as the crow flies, from the construction site of the Fessenheim nuclear power plant. Initially, without prejudice against the young technology, she questioned the potential long-term effects of this new technology on densely populated areas. What scientists at that time were saying publicly on behalf of Électricité de France contrasted with the lack of solid information on potential disasters or effects on the health of the local population. According to Peter-Davis, the official pronouncements painted only a partial portrait, since they evaded the question of radioactive waste or left the issue for future generations, and the potential risks of this technology, which left no room for error, were unknown. Her questions, which went unanswered, led her and many people in Alsace to conclude that the prolonged threat of catastrophic risks to human health and to the ecosystems on which life depends was a heavy price to pay for electricity production. This led her to become one of the pioneers of the anti-nuclear movement in France. Together with Annick Albrecht and Françoise Bucher, she published the magazine that was instrumental in helping residents understand issues that official civil nuclear specialists did not talk about or spoke only positively about.

Peter-Davis co-founded Friends of the Earth and the Verts [the Greens].

In 1985, she adapted eco-consulting from its German context to a French one and founded, in 1987, ECO-Conseil, the European Institute for Environmental Consulting, based in Strasbourg.

She was the Founder-President of the “European Network of Scientific and Technical Cooperation for Environmental Consulting” as well as of the “Laboratory Region for Sustainable Development”.

She was the founding president of the European Network for Scientific and Technical Cooperation in Environmental Consulting and the Sustainable Development Laboratory Region.

She and Garry Davis had two sons and a daughter. They divorced in 1975. She died on 8 October 2022, at the age of 90.

== Awards and distinctions ==
- 1989: Winner of the Alsace Foundation "Rhin-novation" Prize
- 1991: Dame of the National Order of Merit
- 1991: French prize for good environmental management (won by the Banque Populaire du Haut-Rhin, for its program of special loans to SMEs and SMIs for investments in favor of the environment)
- 1993: Honored with the Global 500 Roll of Honor by UNEP (United Nations Environment Program) for its contributions to the environment
- 1994: The Crédit Coopératif Corporate Foundation Initiative Award
- 1998: The Fibre d’Or of the École du Bois
