= World Passport =

Fantasy travel document

The World Passport is a fantasy travel document sold by the World Service Authority, a non-profit organization founded by Garry Davis in 1954.

== Appearance and price ==
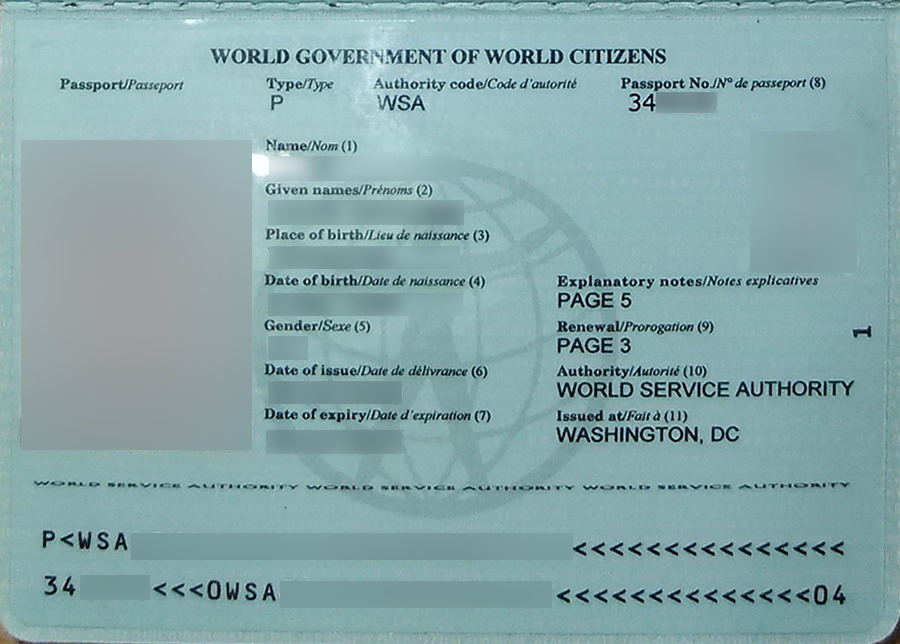
Data page of the World Passport

The World Passport is similar in appearance to a genuine national passport or other such authentic travel document. In 1979 the World Passport was a 42-page document, with a dark blue cover, and text in Arabic, Chinese, English, French, Russian, Spanish, and Esperanto. It contained a five-page section for medical history and a six-page section for listing organisational affiliation. The fee charged at that time was US$32 plus postage for a three-year World Passport that could be renewed for a further two years.

The version of the World Passport current as of 2017 was produced in January 2007. It has an embedded "ghost" photo for security, covered with a plastic film. Its data page is in the format of a machine-readable passport, with an alphanumeric code bar in the machine-readable zone (MRZ) enabling it to be scanned by an optical reader. However, in place of a valid ISO 3166-1 alpha-3 code in the MRZ "issuer" and "nationality" fields, it uses the non-standard code "WSA".

According to the WSA website, the fee is $75 for a three-year World Passport, $100 for five years, and $125 for ten years. A "World Donor Passport" valid for fifteen years with a special cover is issued gratis to donors of at least $500 which, according to the WSA, is used to provide free documents to refugees and stateless persons. In addition, the customer can choose between two World Passport covers: "World Passport" or "World Government Passport". The WSA recommends their customers purchase the second option.

A potential customer must provide as proof of identity a notarized certification of the details on the form, a copy of their national identity papers, or a fingerprint from their right index finger. People have been known to obtain World Passports in names other than their legal names; see the relevant section below.

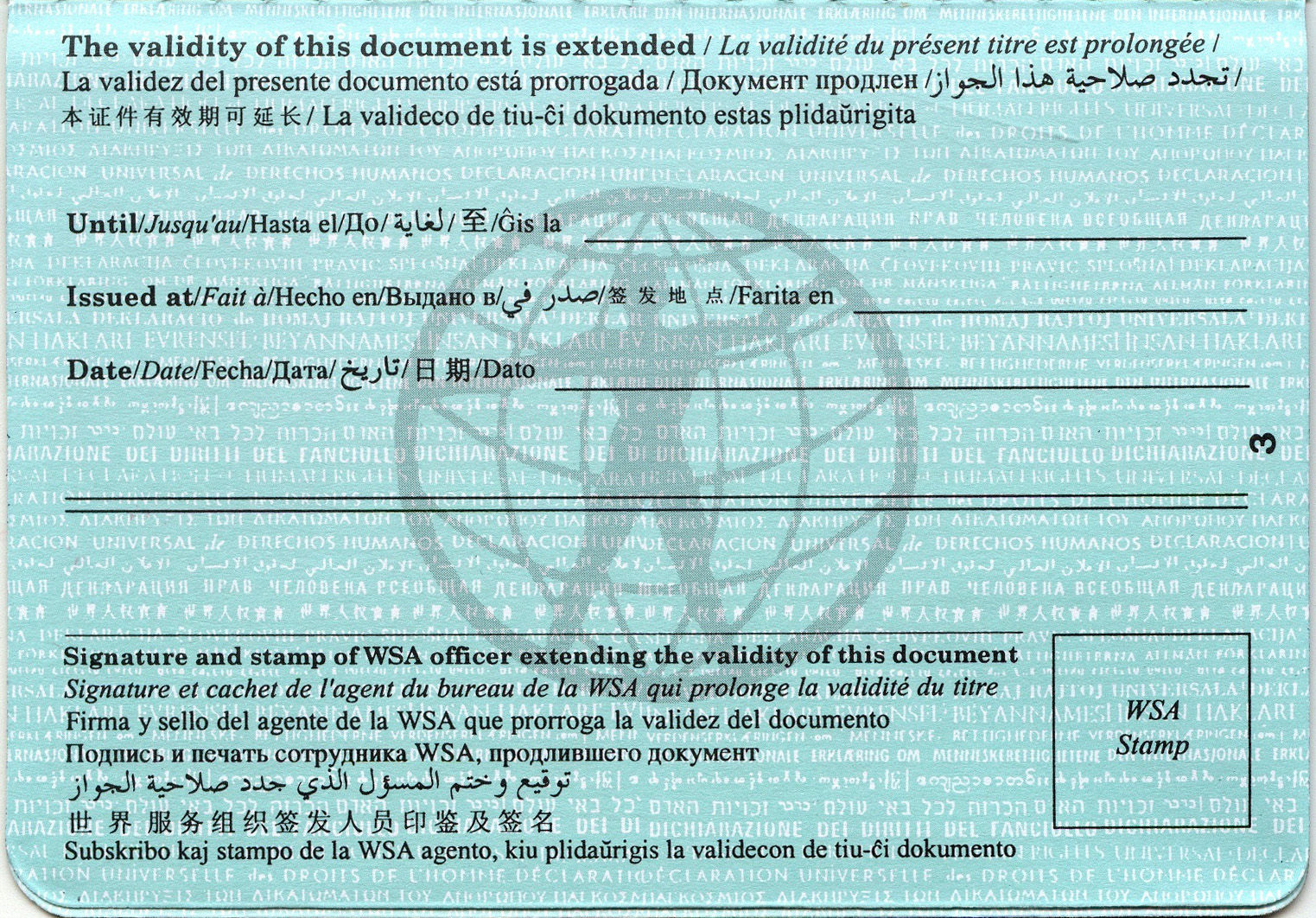
Renewals page

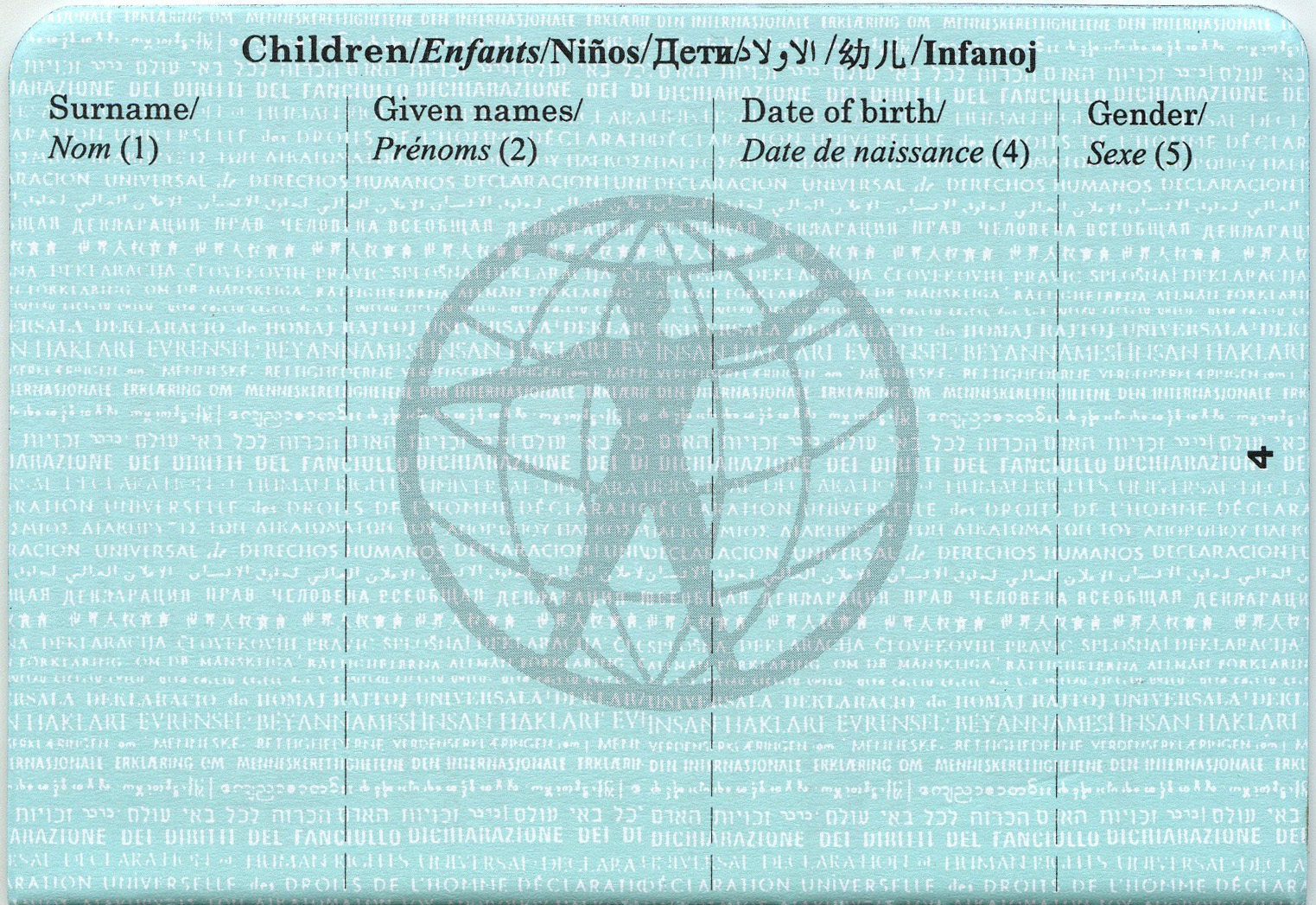
Children's information page

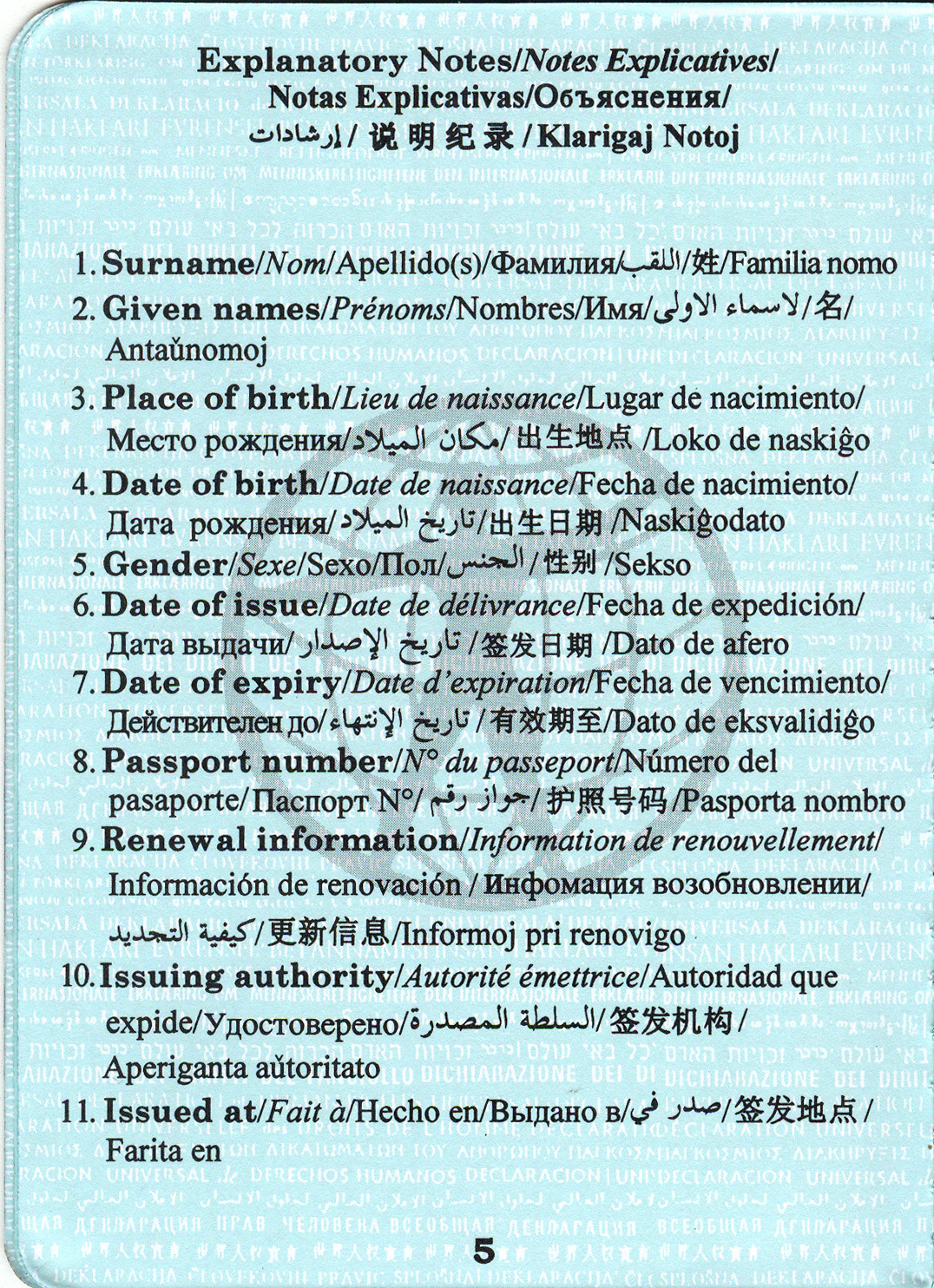
Notes

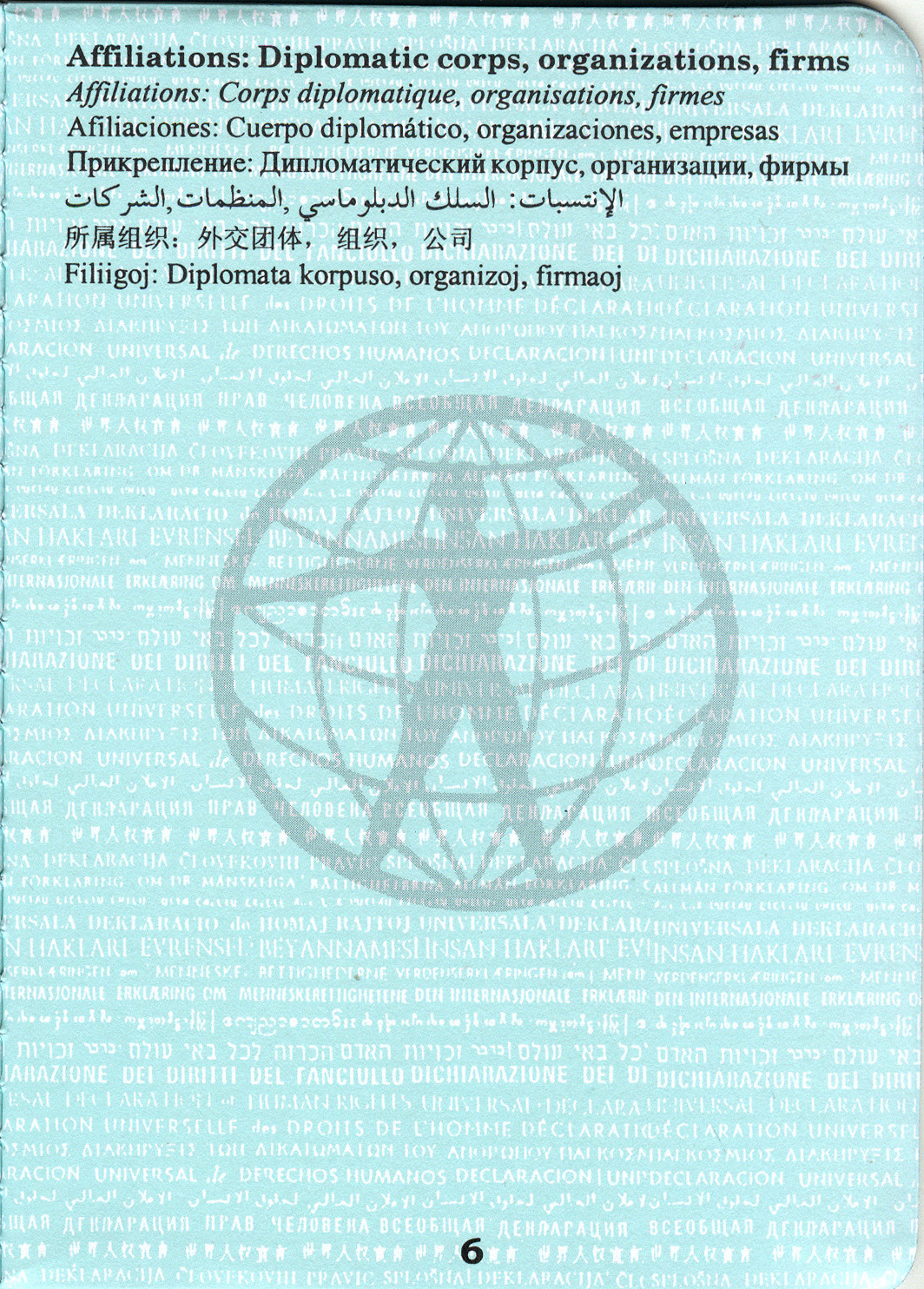
Affiliations page

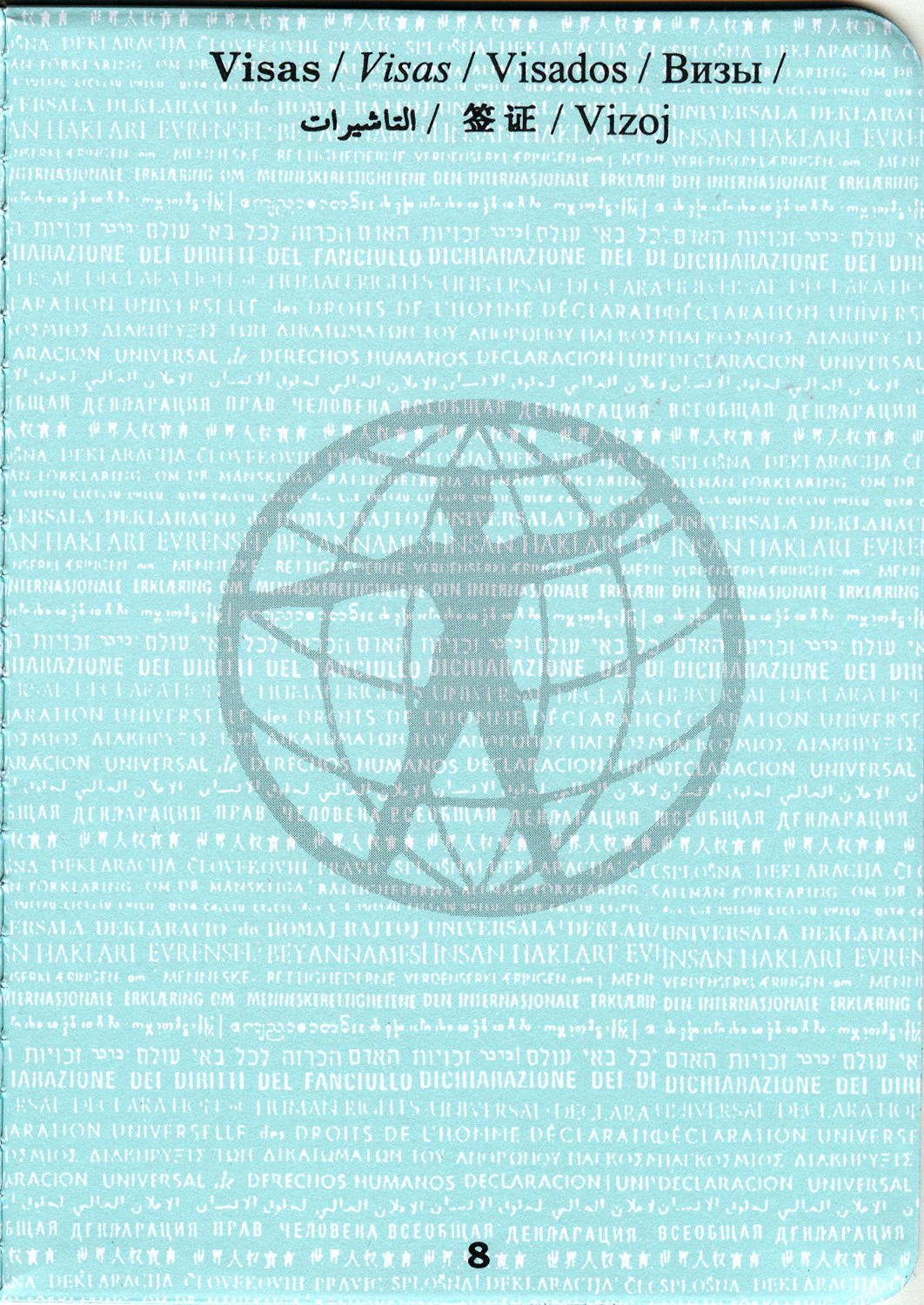
Visa page

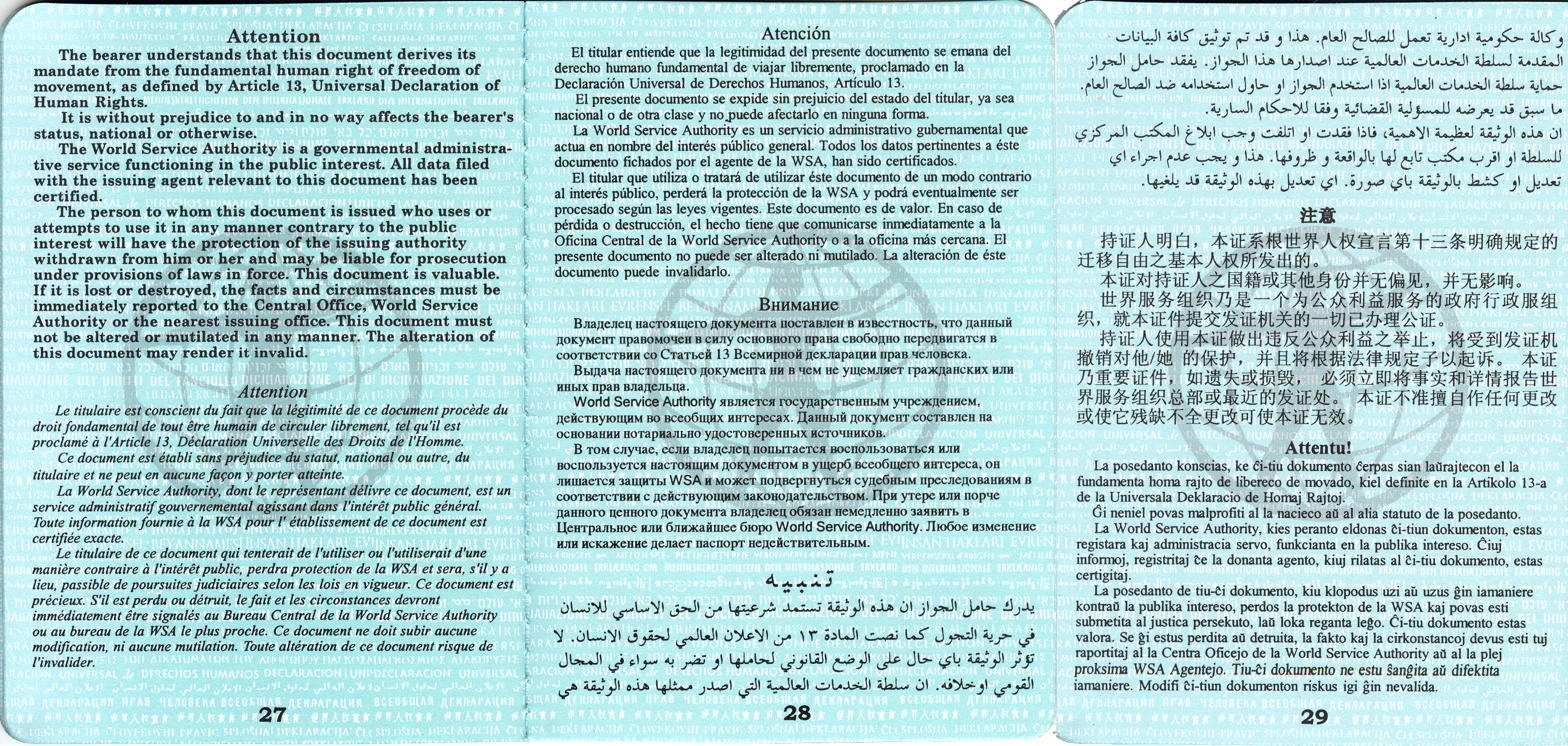
Attention

== As a travel document ==
The appearance is so similar to a genuine passport that in 1974 a criminal case was lodged against Garry Davis in France regarding his sale of World Passports.

According to the WSA, the version of the document introduced in 2007 was filed as a Machine Readable Travel Document (MRTD) with the International Civil Aviation Organization (ICAO). However, ICAO documents on MRTDs cite the World Service Authority and its World Passport as an example of "Fantasy Documents".

=== Notable acceptances ===
Success in crossing a border using a World Passport is generally attributable to the whim or ignorance of individual immigration officers, not official recognition of the document. The World Service Authority website has scans of letters dating from many decades ago from six countries (Burkina Faso, Ecuador, Mauritania, Tanzania, Togo, and Zambia) which the WSA claims is legal recognition of the World Passports. These letters of recognition are several decades old (1954 for Ecuador, 1972 for Burkina Faso, 1975 for Mauritania, 1995 for Tanzania, 1983 for Togo, 1973 for Zambia).

According to the World Service Authority website, some World Passports have reportedly been accepted on a case-by-case basis by over 180 countries (i.e., they have been stamped with a national visa or entry or exit stamp), and according to the World Service Authority some countries in the past accorded the document legal recognition.

The World Passport came under increased international scrutiny in 1996, after the hijacking of the MS Achille Lauro. In the aftermath of the incident, one of the captured hijackers, Youssef Majed al-Molqi, escaped imprisonment in Italy and used a World Passport which he had purchased in 1988 to leave the country and travel to Spain before he was recaptured.

=== Notable rejections ===
Many countries and territories say they do not recognize the World Passport because it is not issued by a competent government authority, and thus does not meet the definition of a passport. By 1975, Garry Davis had already been detained twenty times for his attempts to cross international borders with a World Passport.

==== Commonwealth of Independent States ====
The Russian government states that it does not recognise the World Passport. In a 1995 interview with Kommersant, a spokesman for the Russian Ministry of Foreign Affairs' Department of Consular Services stated that the World Passport is not an acceptable document for proving identity or citizenship status at Russian border crossings; only a diplomatic passport, official passport, seaman's passport, or general civil passport are accepted. However, one Russian media report claims that some members of the House of Romanov, travelling to Saint Petersburg for the reburial of the remains of one of their ancestors, were permitted by Russian authorities to obtain visas in their World Passports, in light of the special situation.

In December 2008, a man claiming to be a Russian citizen attempted to cross the border from Latvia into Belarus at the Urbany checkpoint using a World Passport; he stated he lost his Russian documents while in Sweden. He was arrested by the Belarusian border guards. A spokesman for Belarus' State Border Committee in an interview with a local newspaper stated that Belarus does not accept the World Passport at border crossings. He also claimed it was the first known case of its kind in the country.

==== United States ====
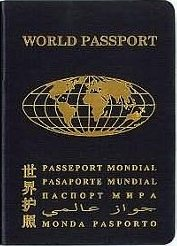
New World Passport

The United States Department of State's official position on the World Passport is that it is a booklet produced by a private organisation upon payment of a fee, and not a passport. As early as 1991, the US Air Transport Association specifically included the World Passport in a training film as an example of unacceptable travel papers. In 2012, a Belizean man attempted to enter the U.S. through the Veterans International Bridge at Los Tomates using a World Passport. The man in question had prior felony convictions for drug trafficking and immigration offences, and had previously been deported from the United States multiple times. He claimed that he wanted to speak with President Obama about genocide in Belize. In a bench trial, Judge Andrew S. Hanen found the man guilty of felony attempted re-entry after deportation.

==== Other countries ====
Activist Kenneth O'Keefe tried to travel to Iraq using a World Passport in 2003, but was rejected transit rights by Turkey, and had to apply for an American passport to continue his journey.

In 2004, two men from China on board China Southern Airlines Flight 302 from Hong Kong to Guangzhou attempted to pass through immigration at Guangzhou Baiyun International Airport using World Passports. The officers at the airport arrested them for illegal entry.

Also, though Garry Davis claims to have traveled to India using a World Passport and to have given one personally to Jawaharlal Nehru, in May 2007 an Indian citizen was arrested for attempting to leave India at Begumpet Airport using a World Passport. The man, intending to travel to the United States, had purchased what he believed was a genuine passport and visa. His travel agency and Air India staff both accepted his World Passport, but Indian immigration did not. The Times of India called it a clear case of "internet fraud" and stated that the man had been "duped".

The Council of the European Union has a table of travel documents entitling the holder to cross external borders of Schengen states and which may be endorsed with a visa; the World Passport is listed as a fantasy passport to which a visa may not be affixed.

In February 2013, both Panama and Costa Rica rejected the use of the World Passport by Sage Million, a fugitive from Hawaii.

Hip-hop artist and actor Yasiin Bey (Mos Def) was arrested in South Africa on January 15, 2016 for attempting to leave the country using a World Passport. He had entered the country using an American passport and had lived in Cape Town since May 2013. South Africa's Department of Home Affairs released a statement saying that Mr. Bey would be allowed to appeal the immigration action and possibly seek permanent residency.

=== Use by refugees and stateless persons ===
The World Service Authority sells World Passports to refugees and other people who are unable to obtain valid, authentic travel documents. According to the WSA, refugees in camps are given free World Passports. WSA reports that it "has [given out] more than 10,000 free World Passports to refugees residing in camps throughout the world" and that it "has documentary evidence that the issuance of such passports may permit refugees to leave such camps to seek asylum elsewhere or to claim other rights often denied to refugees". However, many of those refugees have found World Passports to be useless. According to statements by Garry Davis in the mid-1970s, major users of World Passports at the time included persons in Southeast Asia fleeing from wars, as well as holders of Rhodesian passports who were otherwise unable to travel internationally as no other country accepted their documents besides South Africa.

Many East African refugees arriving in Nordic countries in the early 1990s had World Passports. In July 2011, a Georgian citizen attempted to pass through Latvian border control with a World Passport, though he also had a valid Georgian passport in his possession; after presenting his World Passport, he requested asylum in Latvia.

Another category of users of World Passports are stowaways on ships. Vessel owners are legally responsible for the stowaways until they can find a country to let them ashore, but countries are often reluctant due to questions over the validity of the stowaways' documents. From 1992 to 2006 the WSA sold their document to such individuals on five occasions.

== As an identity document ==
The World Service Authority promotes the World Passport not just as a document for international travel, but a "neutral, apolitical document of identity". Investor Doug Casey, himself a World Passport customer, has suggested that a World Passport is useful at hotels and other non-governmental institutions where security is uncertain; if one is asked to hand over one's real passport in such situations, one can provide the World Passport instead of a genuine national passport. Governmental authorities do not share this assessment.

The Criminal Records Bureau of the United Kingdom Home Office states that registered bodies should not accept the World Passport as a proof of identity, warning that "a fake 'World Passport' can be purchased online by members of the public and should not be confused with a genuine passport". The Isle of Man's Financial Supervision Commission, which regulates the isle's banks and company formation agents, states that the World Passport is not an acceptable document to prove either the nationality or identity of the bearer. Specifically, it classifies it as a spurious or fantasy passport, a term which it defines to mean as documents which "have the appearance of a passport, but are issued by organisations with no authority and to which no official recognition has been given".

The United States Social Security Administration will also not accept any World Service Authority document (including the World Passport and World Donor Passport) as evidence of identity, age, citizenship, alien status, or marital status for either claims or enumeration purposes. The Virginia Department of Social Services explicitly classifies all World Service Authority documents as "unacceptable documents" for verification of identity. The United States Department of State instructs all U.S. embassies and consulates not to provide any notarial, apostille, or other authentication services in respect of World Passports, whether regarding the World Passport itself or documents relating to the purchase of a World Passport. They warn that such documents could be used for fraudulent or criminal purposes. In 1996 a man was able to buy a World Passport in a name that was not his own, but was detected after repeated attempts to use it to prove his identity when opening accounts at various banks in Indiana, without providing a verifiable address or telephone number. He was convicted of fraud on a financial institution.

== As a political statement ==
Regardless of its almost universal lack of acceptance, an individual may also seek to obtain a World Passport as part of a political statement. A number of Russian citizens have obtained the World Passport as a form of protest against the "red tape" imposed by the Russian government on their own citizens aiming to travel abroad. In 1977, two mayors of West Bank towns bought World Passports during a visit by Garry Davis.

== Sale by third parties ==
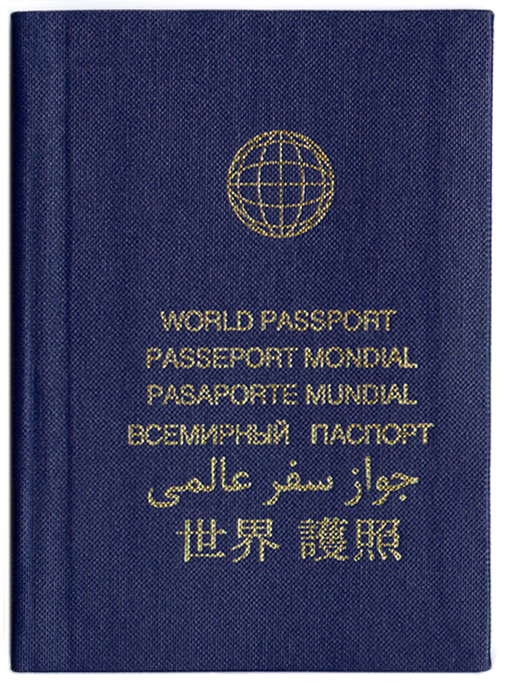
Old version of World Passport

Despite its limited acceptance, other entities have also sought to manufacture and sell the fantasy travel document, without the consent of the WSA. The Isle of Man's Financial Supervision Commission reports that they have identified counterfeit World Passports. Also, the first cross-jurisdictional fake passport case ever found in Guangzhou, Guangdong, China, involved counterfeit World Passports. In February 1981, the local Public Security Bureau identified some Hong Kong criminals who were charging World Passport customers HK$18,000 plus CN¥50-100 (roughly US$3,300 at the official exchange rate at that time) in processing fees, and misrepresenting to them that World Passport customers could settle in any country in the world.

As mentioned above, Russia does not accept World Passports, but in the 1990s, many company formation agents in Russia sold the World Passport together in a package-deal with the setup of an offshore company (international business company), and falsely claimed that all countries of the world accept it as an identity document. In some cases, such companies charged up to US$1,000 for the document alone.

In Malaysia in 1994, a Nigerian man was arrested at the Central Market, Kuala Lumpur by tourist police during an identity check, after he showed a World Passport. A search of his belongings showed that he carried a total of five World Passports, as well as a real Nigerian passport that had been used by another person to travel to Malaysia and Hong Kong. Authorities suspected he might have been trying to sell the fantasy travel documents to other foreign nationals lacking valid travel documents.

== Notable World Passport owners ==
Many notable people have owned World Passports. Although some may have purchased them, the WSA typically gives them to prominent people. Garry Davis, the WSA founder, owned World Passport No. 1, originally manufactured in 1954.

Entertainers who have been given or purchased World Passports include violinist Yehudi Menuhin, actor Patrick Stewart, musician and actor Yasiin Bey (Mos Def) and actor LeVar Burton. Other World Passport holders include activists such as whistleblower Edward Snowden and Julian Assange.

Criminals and terrorists who have owned World Passports include Triston Jay Amero, an American man charged with hotel bombings in Bolivia, and Youssef Majed al-Molqi, one of the hijackers of the MS Achille Lauro in 1985.

The WSA has awarded a number of "honorary World Passports", though these are without approval from those who received them. These honorary documents have been given to figures including Indian prime minister Jawaharlal Nehru, 34th president of the United States Dwight D. Eisenhower, and last president of Czechoslovakia and first president of the Czech Republic Václav Havel.

== See also ==
- Camouflage passport
- World Constitution and Parliament Association
- Transnational citizenship
