= World government =

Notion of a single common political authority for all of humanity

World government is a theoretical single political authority with jurisdiction over all of Earth and humanity. A world government with executive, legislative, and judicial functions and an administrative apparatus has never existed.

The inception of the United Nations (UN) in the mid-20th century remains the closest approximation to a world government, as it is by far the largest and most powerful international institution. The UN is mostly limited to an advisory role, with the stated purpose of fostering cooperation between existing national governments, rather than exerting authority over them.

The concept of universal governance has been the subject of debate. Some thinkers have discussed it as a natural and inevitable outcome of human social evolution, and interest in it has coincided with the trends of globalization. Opponents of world government view the concept as a tool for violent totalitarianism, unfeasible, or simply unnecessary.

== Definition ==
From ancient history to contemporary times, the idea of universal governance by one polity has been the subject of discussion, debate, and advocacy by rulers, philosophers, religious leaders, and secular humanists. Alexander Wendt defines a state as an "organization possessing a monopoly on the legitimate use of organized violence within a society." According to Wendt, a world state would need to fulfill the following requirements:

1. Monopoly on organized violence – states have exclusive use of legitimate force within their own territory.
2. Legitimacy – perceived as right by their own populations, and possibly the global community.
3. Sovereignty – possessing common power and legitimacy.
4. Corporate action – a collection of individuals who act together in a systematic way.

Wendt argues that a world government would not require a centrally controlled army or a central decision-making body, as long as the four conditions are fulfilled. In order to develop a world state, three changes must occur in the world system:

1. Universal security community – a peaceful system of binding dispute resolution without threat of interstate violence.
2. Universal collective security – unified response to crimes and threats.
3. Supranational authority – binding decisions are made that apply to each and every state.

The development of a world government is conceptualized by Wendt as a process through five stages:

1. System of states;
2. Society of states;
3. World society;
4. Collective security;
5. World state.

Wendt argues that a struggle among sovereign individuals results in the formation of a collective identity and eventually a state. The same forces are present within the international system and could possibly, and potentially inevitably lead to the development of a world state through this five-stage process. When the world state would emerge, the traditional expression of states would become localized expressions of the world state. This process occurs within the default state of anarchy present in the world system.

Immanuel Kant conceptualized the state as sovereign individuals formed out of conflict. Part of the traditional philosophical objections to a world state (Kant, Hegel) are overcome by modern technological innovations. Wendt argues that new methods of communication and coordination can overcome these challenges.

A colleague of Wendt in the field of International Relations, Max Ostrovsky, conceptualized the development of a world government as a process in one stage: The world will be divided on two rival blocs, one based on North America and another on Eurasia, which clash in World War III and, "if civilization survives," the victorious power conquers the rest of the world, annexes and establishes world state. Remarkably, Wendt also supposes the alternative of universal conquest leading to world state, provided the conquering power recognizes "its victims as full subjects." In such case, the mission is accomplished "without intermediate stages of development."

International law, also known as public international law and the law of nations, is the set of rules, norms, legal customs and standards that states and other actors feel an obligation to, and generally do, obey in their mutual relations. In international relations, actors are simply the individuals and collective entities, such as states, international organizations, and non-state groups, which can make behavioral choices, whether lawful or unlawful. Rules are formal, typically written expectations that outline required behavior, while norms are informal, often unwritten guidelines about appropriate behavior that are shaped by custom and social practice. It establishes norms for states across a broad range of domains, including war and diplomacy, economic relations, and human rights.

International law differs from state-based domestic legal systems in that it operates largely through consent, since there is no world government to enforce it upon sovereign states. States and non-state actors may choose to not abide by international law, and even to breach a treaty, but such violations, particularly of peremptory norms, can be met with disapproval by others and in some cases coercive action including diplomacy, economic sanctions, and war. The lack of a final authority in international law can also cause far reaching differences. This is partly the effect of states being able to interpret international law in a manner which they see fit. This can lead to problematic stances which can have large local effects.

Since a world government could come in several different forms, from tyrannical to democratic, it has many proponents and detractors across the broad political spectrum. Proponents see it as a natural and inevitable outcome of human social evolution, while opponents view the concept as a tool for violent totalitarianism, unfeasible, or simply unnecessary.

== Pre-modern philosophy ==
=== Antiquity ===
The Chinese had a particularly well-developed notion of world government in the form of Great Unity, or Da Tong (大同), a historical model for a united and just society bound by moral virtue and principles of good governance. The Han dynasty, which successfully united much of China for over four centuries, evidently aspired to this vision by erecting an Altar of the Great Unity in 113 BCE. According to Mencius (1:6) stability is in unity. Both Mencius (9:4) and Alexander the Great (Diodorus Siculus 30:21) claimed that there are neither two suns in cosmos, nor two monarchs on earth.

Contemporaneously, the ancient Greek historian Polybius described Roman rule over much of the known world at the time as a "marvelous" achievement worthy of consideration by future historians. The Pax Romana, a roughly two-century period of stable Roman hegemony across three continents, reflected the positive aspirations of a world government, as it was deemed to have brought prosperity and security to what was once a politically and culturally fractious region. The Adamites were a Christian sect who desired to organize an early form of world government.

=== Dante's universal monarchy ===
The idea of world government outlived the fall of Rome for centuries, particularly in its former heartland of Italy. Medieval peace movements such as the Waldensians gave impetus to utopian philosophers like Marsilius of Padua to envision a world without war. In his fourteenth-century work De Monarchia, Florentine poet and philosopher Dante Alighieri appealed for a universal monarchy that would work separate from and uninfluenced by the Catholic Church to establish peace in humanity's lifetime and the afterlife, respectively:

But what has been the condition of the world since that day the seamless robe [of Pax Romana] first suffered mutilation by the claws of avarice, we can read—would that we could not also see! O human race! what tempests must need toss thee, what treasure be thrown into the sea, what shipwrecks must be endured, so long as thou, like a beast of many heads, strivest after diverse ends! Thou art sick in either intellect, or sick likewise in thy affection. Thou healest not thy high understanding by argument irrefutable, nor thy lower by the countenance of experience. Nor dost thou heal thy affection by the sweetness of divine persuasion, when the voice of the Holy Spirit breathes upon thee, 'Behold, how good and how pleasant it is for brethren to dwell together in unity!'

Di Gattinara was an Italian diplomat who widely promoted Dante's De Monarchia and its call for a universal monarchy. An advisor of Maximilian I, Holy Roman Emperor, and the chancellor of Charles V, Holy Roman Emperor, he conceived global government as uniting all Christian nations under a Respublica Christiana, which was the only political entity able to establish world peace.

== Modern philosophy ==
=== Hugo Grotius (1583–1645) ===
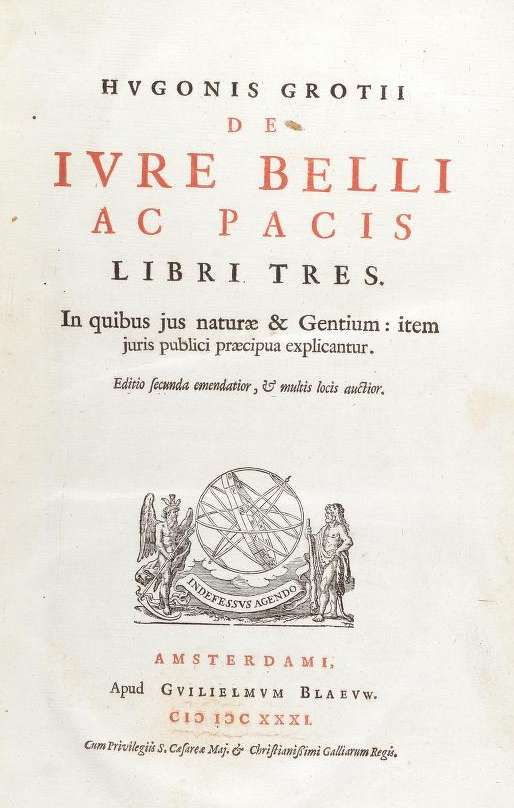
Title page of the 1631 second edition of De jure belli ac pacis

The Dutch philosopher and jurist Hugo Grotius, widely regarded as a founder of international law, believed in the eventual formation of a world government to enforce it. His book, De jure belli ac pacis (On the Law of War and Peace), published in Paris in 1625, is still cited as a foundational work in the field. Though he does not advocate for world government per se, Grotius argues that a "common law among nations", consisting of a framework of principles of natural law, bind all people and societies regardless of local custom.

=== Immanuel Kant (1724–1804) ===
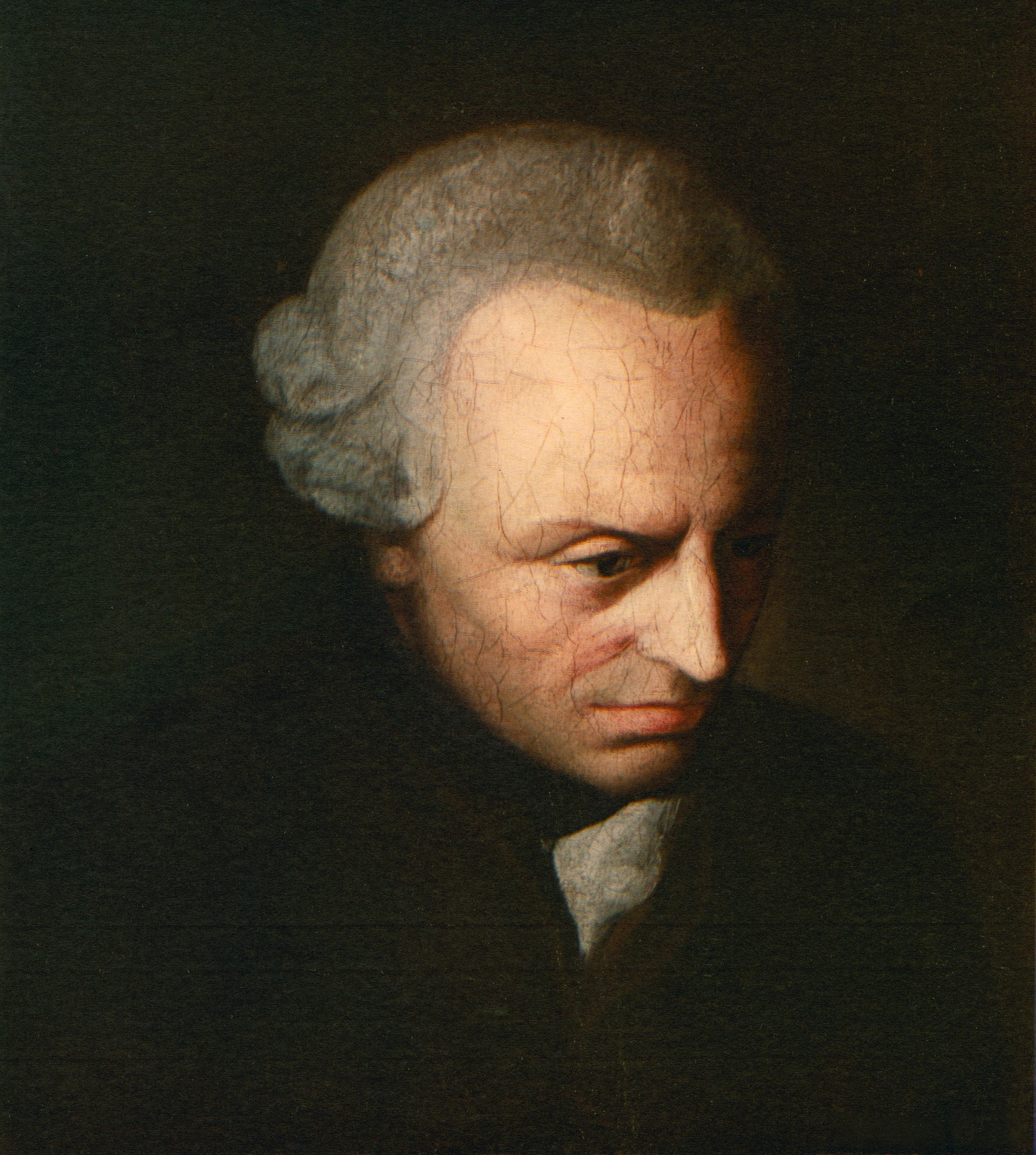
Writing in 1795, Immanuel Kant considered World Citizenship to be a necessary step in establishing world peace.

In his essay "Perpetual Peace: A Philosophical Sketch" (1795), Kant describes three basic requirements for organizing human affairs to permanently abolish the threat of present and future war, and, thereby, help establish a new era of lasting peace throughout the world. Kant described his proposed peace program as containing two steps.

The "Preliminary Articles" described the steps that should be taken immediately, or with all deliberate speed:

1. "No Secret Treaty of Peace Shall Be Held Valid in Which There Is Tacitly Reserved Matter for a Future War"
2. "No Independent States, Large or Small, Shall Come under the Dominion of Another State by Inheritance, Exchange, Purchase, or Donation"
3. "Standing Armies Shall in Time Be Totally Abolished"
4. "National Debts Shall Not Be Contracted with a View to the External Friction of States"
5. "No State Shall by Force Interfere with the Constitution or Government of Another State,
6. "No State Shall, during War, Permit Such Acts of Hostility Which Would Make Mutual Confidence in the Subsequent Peace Impossible: Such Are the Employment of Assassins (percussores), Poisoners (venefici), Breach of Capitulation, and Incitement to Treason (perduellio) in the Opposing State"

Three Definitive Articles would provide not merely a cessation of hostilities, but a foundation on which to build a peace.

1. "The Civil Constitution of Every State Should Be Republican"
2. "The Law of Nations Shall be Founded on a Federation of Free States"
3. "The Law of World Citizenship Shall Be Limited to Conditions of Universal Hospitality"

Kant argued against a world government on the grounds that it would be prone to tyranny. He instead advocated for league of independent republican states akin to the intergovernmental organizations that would emerge over a century and a half later.

=== Johann Gottlieb Fichte (1762–1814) ===
The year of the battle at Jena (1806), when Napoleon overwhelmed Prussia, Johann Gottlieb Fichte in Characteristics of the Present Age described what he perceived to be a very deep and dominant historical trend:

There is necessary tendency in every cultivated State to extend itself generally... Such is the case in Ancient History ... As the States become stronger in themselves and cast off that [Papal] foreign power, the tendency towards a Universal Monarchy over the whole Christian World necessarily comes to light... This tendency ... has shown itself successively in several States which could make pretensions to such a dominion, and since the fall of the Papacy, it has become the sole animating principle of our History... Whether clearly or not—it may be obscurely—yet has this tendency lain at the root of the undertakings of many States in Modern Times... Although no individual Epoch may have contemplated this purpose, yet is this the spirit which runs through all these individual Epochs, and invisibly urges them onward.

== Supranational movements ==
International organizations started forming in the late 19th century, among the earliest being the International Committee of the Red Cross in 1863, the Telegraphic Union in 1865 and the Universal Postal Union in 1874. The increase in international trade at the turn of the 20th century accelerated the formation of international organizations, and, by the start of World War I in 1914, there were approximately 450 of them.

Some notable philosophers and political leaders were also promoting the value of world government during the post-industrial, pre-World War era. Ulysses S. Grant, US president, was convinced that rapid advances in technology and industry would result in greater unity and eventually "one nation, so that armies and navies are no longer necessary." In China, political reformer Kang Youwei viewed human political organization growing into fewer, larger units, eventually into "one world". Bahá'u'lláh founded the Baháʼí Faith teaching that the establishment of world unity and a global federation of nations was a key principle of the religion. Author H. G. Wells was a strong proponent of the creation of a world state, arguing that such a state would ensure world peace and justice. Karl Marx, the traditional founder of communism, predicted a socialist epoch in which the working class throughout the world will unite to render nationalism meaningless. Anti-Communists believed world government was a goal of World Communism.

=== Theodore Roosevelt ===
As early as his 1905 statement to Congress, U.S. president Theodore Roosevelt highlighted the need for "an organization of the civilized nations" and cited the international arbitration tribunal at The Hague as a role model to be advanced further. During his acceptance speech for the 1906 Nobel Peace Prize, Roosevelt described a world federation as a "master stroke" and advocated for some form of international police power to maintain peace. Historian William Roscoe Thayer observed that the speech "foreshadowed many of the terms which have since been preached by the advocates of a League of Nations", which would not be established for another 14 years. Hamilton Holt of The Independent lauded Roosevelt's plan for a "Federation of the World", writing that not since the "Great Design" of Henry IV has "so comprehensive a plan" for universal peace been proposed.

Although Roosevelt supported global government conceptually, he was critical of specific proposals and of leaders of organizations promoting the cause of international governance. According to historian John Milton Cooper, Roosevelt praised the plan of his presidential successor, William Howard Taft, for "a league under existing conditions and with such wisdom in refusing to let adherence to the principle be clouded by insistence upon improper or unimportant methods of enforcement that we can speak of the league as a practical matter."

In a 1907 letter to Andrew Carnegie, Roosevelt expressed his hope "to see The Hague Court greatly increased in power and permanency", and in one of his very last public speeches he said: "Let us support any reasonable plan whether in the form of a League of Nations or in any other shape, which bids fair to lessen the probable number of future wars and to limit their scope."

=== Founding of the League of Nations ===
The League of Nations (LoN) was an intergovernmental organization founded as a result of the Treaty of Versailles in 1919–1920. At its largest size from 28 September 1934 to 23 February 1935, it had 58 members. The League's goals included upholding the Rights of Man, such as the rights of non-whites, women, and soldiers; disarmament, preventing war through collective security, settling disputes between countries through negotiation, diplomacy, and improving global quality of life. The diplomatic philosophy behind the League represented a fundamental shift in thought from the preceding hundred years. The League lacked its own armed force and so depended on the Great Powers to enforce its resolutions and economic sanctions and provide an army, when needed. However, these powers proved reluctant to do so. Lacking many of the key elements necessary to maintain world peace, the League failed to prevent World War II. Adolf Hitler withdrew Germany from the League of Nations once he planned to take over Europe. The rest of the Axis powers soon followed. Having failed its primary goal, the League of Nations fell apart. The League of Nations consisted of the Assembly, the council, and the Permanent Secretariat. Below these were many agencies. The Assembly was where delegates from all member states conferred. Each country was allowed three representatives and one vote.

=== Competing visions during World War II ===
The Nazi Party of Germany envisaged the establishment of a world government under the complete hegemony of the Third Reich. In its move to overthrow the post-World War I Treaty of Versailles, Germany had already withdrawn itself from the League of Nations, and it did not intend to join a similar internationalist organization ever again. In his stated political aim of expanding the living space (Lebensraum) of the Germanic people by destroying or driving out "lesser-deserving races" in and from other territories, dictator Adolf Hitler devised an ideological system of self-perpetuating expansionism, in which the growth of a state's population would require the conquest of more territory which would, in turn, lead to a further growth in population which would then require even more conquests. In 1927, Rudolf Hess relayed to Walther Hewel Hitler's belief that world peace could only be acquired "when one power, the racially best one, has attained uncontested supremacy". When this control would be achieved, this power could then set up for itself a world police and assure itself "the necessary living space.... The lower races will have to restrict themselves accordingly".

During its imperial period (1868–1947), the Japanese Empire elaborated a worldview, Hakkō ichiu, translated as "eight corners of the world under one roof". This was the idea behind the attempt to establish a Greater East Asia Co-Prosperity Sphere and behind the struggle for world domination. The British Empire, the largest in history, was viewed by some historians as a form of world government.

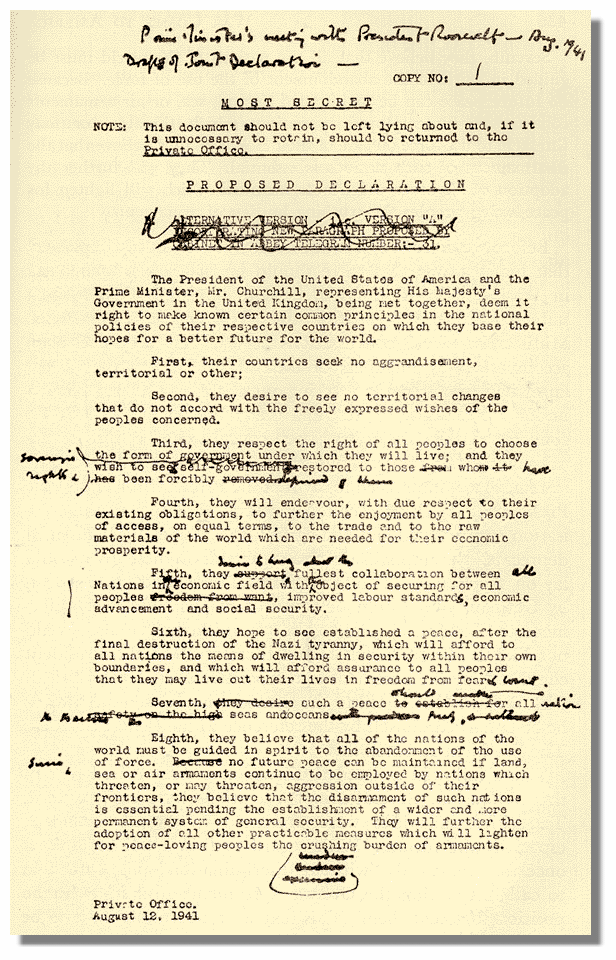
Winston Churchill's edited copy of the final draft of the Atlantic Charter

The Atlantic Charter was a published statement agreed between the United Kingdom and the United States. It was intended as the blueprint for the postwar world after World War II, and turned out to be the foundation for many of the international agreements that currently shape the world. The General Agreement on Tariffs and Trade (GATT), the post-war independence of British and French possessions, and much more are derived from the Atlantic Charter. The Atlantic charter was made to show the goals of the allied powers during World War II. It first started with the United States and Great Britain, and later all the allies would follow the charter. Some goals include access to raw materials, reduction of trade restrictions, and freedom from fear and wants. The name, The Atlantic Charter, came from a newspaper that coined the title. However, Winston Churchill would use it, and from then on the Atlantic Charter was the official name. In retaliation, the Axis powers would raise their morale and try to work their way into Great Britain. The Declaration by United Nations formalized the organization of the Allies of World War II. The postwar United Nations would become the closest thing the world has to a world government in contemporary times.

On June 5, 1948, at the dedication of the War Memorial in Omaha, Nebraska, U.S. President Harry S. Truman remarked, "We must make the United Nations continue to work, and to be a going concern, to see that difficulties between nations may be settled just as we settle difficulties between States here in the United States. When Kansas and Colorado fall out over the waters in the Arkansas River, they don't go to war over it; they go to the Supreme Court of the United States, and the matter is settled in a just and honorable way. There is not a difficulty in the whole world that cannot be settled in exactly the same way in a world court". The cultural moment of the late 1940s was the peak of World Federalism among Americans.

=== Founding of the United Nations ===
Emblem of the United Nations

World War II (1939–1945) resulted in an unprecedented scale of destruction of lives (over 60 million dead, most of them civilians), and the use of weapons of mass destruction. Some of the acts committed against civilians during the war were on such a massive scale of savagery, they came to be widely considered as crimes against humanity itself. As the war's conclusion drew near, many shocked voices called for the establishment of institutions able to permanently prevent deadly international conflicts. This led to the founding of the United Nations (UN) in 1945, which adopted the Universal Declaration of Human Rights in 1948.

The UN was and remains mostly an advisory body dedicated to enhancing cooperation between national governments, as opposed to exerting authority over them. Nevertheless, the organization is commonly viewed as either a model for, or preliminary step towards, a global government.

Many, however, felt that the UN, essentially a forum for discussion and coordination between sovereign governments, was insufficiently empowered for the task. A number of prominent persons, such as Albert Einstein, Winston Churchill, Bertrand Russell, Mahatma Gandhi and Jawaharlal Nehru, called on governments to proceed further by taking gradual steps towards forming an effectual federal world government. Some of these figures discussed it as a natural and inevitable outcome of human social evolution.

The United Nations main goal is to work on international law, international security, economic development, human rights, social progress, and eventually world peace. The United Nations replaced the League of Nations in 1945, after World War II. Almost every internationally recognized country is in the U.N.; as it contains 193 member states out of the 196 total nations of the world. The United Nations gather regularly in order to solve big problems throughout the world. There are six official languages: Arabic, Chinese, English, French, Russian and Spanish.

The United Nations is also financed by some of the wealthiest nations. The flag shows the Earth from a map that shows all of the populated continents.

==== United Nations Parliamentary Assembly (UNPA) ====
Emblem of the United Nations Parliamentary Assembly

A United Nations Parliamentary Assembly (UNPA) is a proposed addition to the United Nations System that would allow for participation of member nations' legislators and, eventually, direct election of UN parliament members by citizens worldwide. The idea of a world parliament was raised at the founding of the League of Nations in the 1920s and again following the end of World War II in 1945, but remained dormant throughout the Cold War.

In the 1990s and 2000s, the rise of global trade and the power of world organizations that govern it led to calls for a parliamentary assembly to scrutinize their activity. The Campaign for a United Nations Parliamentary Assembly was formed in 2007 by Democracy Without Borders to coordinate pro-UNPA efforts, which as of January 2019 has received the support of over 1,500 Members of Parliament from over 100 countries worldwide, in addition to numerous non-governmental organizations, Nobel and Right Livelihood laureates and heads or former heads of state or government and foreign ministers.

==== Garry Davis ====
In France, 1948, Garry Davis began an unauthorized speech calling for a world government from the balcony of the UN General Assembly, until he was dragged away by the guards. Davis renounced his American citizenship and started a Registry of World Citizens. On September 4, 1953, Davis announced from the city hall of Ellsworth, Maine, the formation of the "World Government of World Citizens" based on three "World Laws": One God (or Absolute Value), One World, and One Humanity.

=== Atomic impact ===
The world government movement reached its peak of popularity following the atomic bombing of Japan, especially in the West and Japan. Particularly evident among American scientists, occurred what the editor of the Bulletin of the Atomic Scientists, Eugene Rabinowitch, called "the conspiracy to preserve our civilization by scaring men into rationality." The editor of "World Constitution," Robert Maynard Hutchins, saw the atomic bomb as heralding the “good news of damnation” that would frighten people into world state. “Splitting the atom means uniting the world,” begins a 1946 review of literature which came to light following the “bomb’s early light.” People around the world and within the United States shared this sentiment.

Symbolized by the most popular slogan, “One World or None” and by the Doomsday Clock on the front of the Bulletin of the Atomic Scientists, the fear of a nuclear holocaust had played a key part in the world government movement. But, judging from numerous barometers of public sentiment, this fear could not hold.

By the early 1950s, world state movements went out of fashion. Gary Davis returned to the United States and applied for restoration of his American citizenship. Despite massive efforts to frighten humanity into world state, the 1949 World Peace Day celebration in Hiroshima was strangely lighthearted by fireworks, confetti, and the appearance on stage of a “Miss Hiroshima."

=== World Federalist Movement ===
The years between the end of World War II and the start of the Korean War—which roughly marked the entrenchment of Cold War polarity—saw a flourishing of the nascent world federalist movement. Wendell Willkie's 1943 book One World sold over 2 million copies, laying out many of the argument and principles that would inspire global federalism. A contemporaneous work, Emery Reves' The Anatomy of Peace (1945), argued for replacing the UN with a federal world government. The world Federalist movement in the U.S., led by diverse figures such as Lola Maverick Lloyd, Grenville Clark, Norman Cousins, and Alan Cranston, grew larger and more prominent: in 1947, several grassroots organizations merged to form the United World Federalists—later renamed the World Federalist Association, then Citizens for Global Solutions—claiming 47,000 members by 1949.

Similar movements concurrently formed in many other countries, culminating in a 1947 meeting in Montreux, Switzerland that formed a global coalition called the World Federalist Movement (WFM). By 1950, the movement claimed 56 member groups in 22 countries, with some 156,000 members.

==== Convention to propose amendments to the United States Constitution ====
In 1949, six U.S. states—California, Connecticut, Florida, Maine, New Jersey, and North Carolina—applied for an Article V convention to propose an amendment "to enable the participation of the United States in a world federal government". Multiple other state legislatures introduced or debated the same proposal. These resolutions were part of this effort.

During the 81st United States Congress (1949–1951), multiple resolutions were introduced favoring a world federation.

==== Chicago World Constitution draft ====
A committee of academics and intellectuals formed by Robert Maynard Hutchins of the University of Chicago published a Preliminary Draft of a World Constitution and from 1947 to 1951 published a magazine edited by the daughter of Thomas Mann, Elisabeth Mann Borgese, which was devoted to world government; its title was Common Cause.

==== Albert Einstein and World Constitution ====
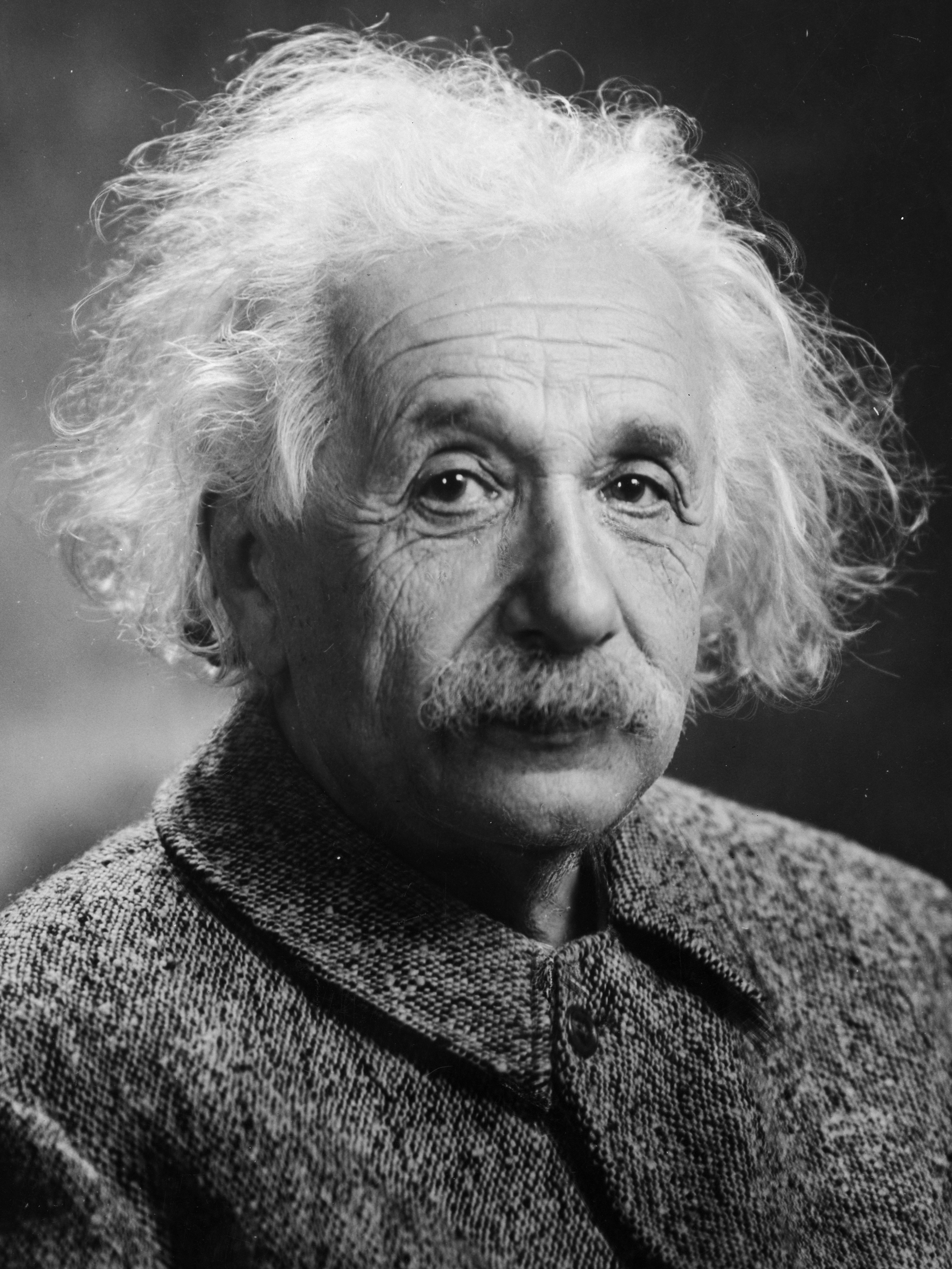
Einstein (1947; age 68).

Einstein grew increasingly convinced that the world was veering off course. He arrived at the conclusion that the gravity of the situation demanded more profound actions and the establishment of a "world government" was the only logical solution. In his "Open Letter to the General Assembly of the United Nations" of October 1947, Einstein emphasized the urgent need for international cooperation and the establishment of a world government. In the year 1948, Einstein invited United World Federalists, Inc. (UWF) president Cord Meyer to a meeting of the Emergency Committee of Atomic Scientists (ECAS) and joined UWF as a member of the advisory board. Einstein and ECAS assisted UWF in fundraising and provided supporting material. Einstein described United World Federalists as: "the group nearest to our aspirations". Einstein and other prominent figures sponsored the Peoples' World Convention (PWC), which took place in 1950–51 and later continued in the form of world constituent assemblies in 1968, 1977, 1978–79, and 1991. This effort was successful in creating a world constitution and a Provisional World Government.

Constitution for the Federation of Earth drafted by international legal experts during world constituent assemblies in 1968 and finalized in 1991, is a framework of a world federalist government. A Provisional World Government consisting of a Provisional World Parliament (PWP), a transitional international legislative body, operates under the framework of this world constitution. This parliament convenes to work on global issues, gathering delegates from different countries.

== Cold War ==
In January 1946, US Under Secretary of State, Sumner Welles, replied to the proponents of world government on the pages of Atlantic Monthly. From the beginning, he could not imagine the Soviet Union participating in a world government upon any other basis than that of a “World Union of Soviet Socialist Republics with the capital . . . in Moscow.” The Soviets reacted negatively on the idea of world state. Soviet Foreign Minister, Vyacheslav Molotov, warned of “world domination by way of… world government.”.

Having found the Soviets less cooperative than expected, the Western scientific community abandoned the debate how to create world government and engaged in the creation of the hydrogen bomb. By 1950, the Cold War began to dominate international politics and the UN Security Council became effectively paralyzed by its permanent members' ability to exercise veto power. The United Nations Security Council Resolution 82 and 83 backed the defense of South Korea, although the Soviets were then boycotting meetings in protest.

While enthusiasm for multinational federalism in Europe incrementally led, over the following decades, to the formation of the European Union, the Cold War eliminated the prospects of any progress towards federation with a more global scope. Global integration became stagnant during the Cold War, and the conflict became the driver behind one-third of all wars during the period. The idea of world government all but disappeared from wide public discourse.

=== Post–Cold War ===
As the Cold War dwindled in 1991, interest in a federal world government was renewed. When the conflict ended by 1992, without the external assistance, many proxy wars petered out or ended by negotiated settlements. This kicked off a period in the 1990s of unprecedented international activism and an expansion of international institutions. According to the Human Security Report 2005, this was the first effective functioning of the United Nations as it was designed to operate.

== Current system of global governance ==
There is no functioning global international military, executive, legislature, judiciary, or constitution with jurisdiction over the entire planet. Increased globalization following the Cold War led to more interest in the topic around the world.

=== International criminal courts ===
The International Court of Justice (ICJ; French: Cour internationale de justice, CIJ), or colloquially the World Court, is the principal judicial organ of the United Nations (UN). It settles legal disputes submitted to it by states and provides advisory opinions on legal questions referred to it by other UN organs and specialized agencies.

=== Inter-governmental organizations ===
Flag of the United Nations

The United Nations (UN) is the primary formal organization coordinating activities between states on a global scale and the only inter-governmental organization with near-universal membership (193 governments). In addition to the main organs and various humanitarian programs and commissions of the UN itself, there are about 20 functional organizations affiliated with the United Nations Economic and Social Council (ECOSOC), such as the World Health Organization, the International Labour Organization, and International Telecommunication Union. Of particular interest politically are the World Bank, the International Monetary Fund and the World Trade Organization.

=== International militaries ===
Militarily, the UN deploys peacekeeping forces, usually to build and maintain post-conflict peace and stability. When a more aggressive international military action is undertaken, either ad hoc coalitions (for example, the Multi-National Force – Iraq) or regional military alliances (for example, NATO) are used.

=== International monetary system ===
The World Bank and the International Monetary Fund (IMF) were founded to foster global monetary cooperation and to fight poverty by financially assisting states in need.

=== International trade ===
The World Trade Organization (WTO) sets the rules of international trade. It has a semi-legislative body (the General Council, reaching decisions by consensus) and a judicial body (the Dispute Settlement Body). Another influential economical international organization is the Organisation for Economic Co-operation and Development (OECD), with membership of 30 democratic members.

== Examples of regional integration of states ==
There are a number of regional organizations that, while not supranational unions, have adopted or intend to adopt policies that may lead to a similar sort of integration in some respects. The European Union is generally recognized as the most integrated among these.

- African Union (AU)
- Arab League
- Association of Southeast Asian Nations (ASEAN)
- Caribbean Community (CARICOM)
- Central American Integration System (SICA)
- Commonwealth of Independent States (CIS)
- Commonwealth of Nations
- Cooperation Council for the Arab States of the Gulf (CCASG)
- East African Community (EAC)
- Economic Cooperation Organization (ECO)
- Eurasian Economic Union (EAEU)
- European Union (EU)
- North Atlantic Treaty Organization (NATO)
- Organization of American States (OAS)
- South Asian Association for Regional Cooperation (SAARC)
- Turkic Council (TurkKon)
- Union of South American Nations (UNASUR)
- Union State

Other organisations that have also discussed greater integration include:

- Arab League into an "Arab Union"
- Caribbean Community (CARICOM) into a "Caribbean Federation"
- North American Free Trade Agreement (NAFTA) into a "North American Union"
- Pacific Islands Forum into a "Pacific Union"

== In media ==
Flag of the World Government from One Piece

The flag of the Government of Earth from Futurama

World government for Earth is frequently featured in fiction, particularly within the science fiction genre; well-known examples include the "World State" in Aldous Huxley's Brave New World, the "Dictatorship of the Air" in H. G. Wells' The Shape of Things to Come, the United Nations in James S. A Corey's The Expanse, and United Earth (amongst other planetary sovereignties and even larger polities) in the Star Trek franchise. The theme is also featured in Christian right (particularly evangelical) apocalyptic media, such as the A Thief in the Night film series, the book The Late Great Planet Earth, Pat Robertson's book The New World Order, and the Left Behind book series. This concept also applies to other genres, while not as commonly, including well-known examples such as One Piece and Futurama.

=== In modern conspiracy theories ===
The concept of world government is a recurring theme in modern conspiracy theories. The most popular of these is that of the New World Order (NWO), which is a term often used in conspiracy theories which speculate about a secretly emerging totalitarian world government. Many influential historical and contemporary figures have therefore been alleged to be part of a cabal that operates through numerous front organizations to orchestrate significant political, social and economic events, including taking advantage of crises or even causing them in order to push through controversial policies at both national and international levels, as steps in an ongoing plot to achieve world domination.

== See also ==
- World domination
- Global governance
- New world order (politics)
- New World Order (conspiracy theory)
- Internationalism
- New world order (Baháʼí)
- United States of Europe
- United States of Africa
- International organization
