= Global democracy =

Global democracy may lie in the scope of:

- Cosmopolitan democracy, a project of normative political theory which explores the application of norms and values of democracy at different levels, from global to local
- Democratic mundialization, one of the movements aiming at democratic globalization, the concept of an institutional system of global democracy that would give world citizens a say in world organizations.
