= Bitnation =

Digital nation

- Founded: 14 July 2014
- Founder: Susanne Tarkowski Tempelhof
- Headquarters: Switzerland
- Area served: Worldwide
- Website: bitnation.co

Bitnation, or crypto nation, was a cryptocurrency-based project self-described as a "voluntary nation", wherein all citizens chose to be citizens, founded in 2014 by Susanne Tarkowski Tempelhof. A part of the process for becoming a citizen involved recording vital records, identity, and other legal events through the use of a smart contract on the Ethereum blockchain.

As of August 2022, the bitnation.co domain name had been sold, and the project is considered defunct.

== History ==
Bitnation founder Susanne Tarkowski Tempelhof grew up in a Franco-Swedish family where her father had been stateless for a decade. She was inspired by blockchain technology, and Bitcoin inspired her to extend it into education and national security, which gradually evolved into the backbone concepts of the modern startup company Bitnation. Bitnation was founded on 14 July 2014 by Tempelhof.

== Media ==
Bitnation was the subject of a Vice piece in September 2016 wherein the author noted that "because a nation is as much an ideological concept as it is a legal one, one strength of Bitnation lies in its ability to give agency to groups who have been ignored or repressed by modern nation-states."

The Atlantic noted in February 2018 that "Bitnation [is] proposing a 'peer-to-peer voluntary governance system' to replace the arbitrariness of birth as the decider of one’s citizenship. Blockchain governance could allow for the creation of virtual citizenship and autonomous communities distinct from territorial nation-states."

Bitnation also received notable coverage in The Economist and The Wall Street Journal for its experimental work using blockchain technology to solve the migrant crisis.

== Awards and accolades ==
In April 2017, Bitnation's BRER (Bitnation Refugee Emergency Response) programme was one of those awarded by the Grand Prix 2017, an annual Netexplo Forum prize co-organized by UNESCO.

== Bibliographies ==
- The Googlement: A Do-It-Yourself Guide to Starting Your Own Nation (and Changing the World) (2014), Susanne Tarkowski Tempelhof, Nortia Press (English) ISBN 0988879859
- Swarmwise (14 February 2013), Rick Falkvinge, Chapter 1–6, English, online journal
