= Camouflage passport =

False identity document

A New Granada camouflage passport. The design on this cover includes the name of a country that no longer exists (New Granada) and a fictional coat of arms based on the coat of arms of Dominica.

A camouflage passport is a document, designed to look like a real passport, issued in the name of a non-existent country or entity. It may be sold with matching documents, such as an international driver's license, club membership card, insurance documents or similar supporting identity papers. Such a passport is intended to allow a person to disguise their true nationality, in a potentially dangerous situation where the passport is only superficially checked.

A camouflage passport is not a real, valid passport and is to be distinguished from a valid second passport (which an individual with dual citizenship may be eligible to hold), a novelty fantasy passport, or a fake of a real passport.

== Origins ==
False identity documents have a long history, but in 1998, the idea of the camouflage passport was credited by the Financial Times to Donna Walker of Houston, who said she had got the idea ten years earlier when an American on a hijacked aircraft was shot because of her nationality.

Walker said that she started by asking the Sri Lankan embassy whether they still had rights over the name Ceylon and, finding they did not, went on to ask the U.S. State Department whether producing a passport in that name would be legal, and they "couldn't show [her] it wasn't". Walker went on to produce hundreds of passports in different country names, trading as International Documents Service, and described her "finest hour" as being during the Iraqi invasion of Kuwait when a group of European oil executives were able to use her documents to pass through Iraqi checkpoints and escape to Jordan.

She said the basic idea was to look like "a not very interesting man from a not very interesting country".

== Form ==
Camouflage passports are generally produced in the name of countries that no longer exist or have changed their name.

Often these are former colonies that changed their name on independence, or use the names of places or political subdivisions that exist within a real country but have never issued or cannot issue passports (for instance, the British Hebrides which are islands off the west coast of Scotland that have never been separately independent).

Usually, the names chosen have a plausible or familiar ring to them. Names that have been used include:

- British Guiana (now Guyana)
- British Hebrides (islands off the west coast of Scotland usually known just as "The Hebrides")
- British Honduras (now Belize)
- British Hong Kong (now a Special Administrative Region of China, never had the prefix "British")
- British West Indies (has never existed as a passport-issuing entity)
- Burma (now Myanmar)
- Ceylon (now Sri Lanka)
- Dutch Guiana (now Suriname)
- Eastern Samoa (now American Samoa)
- Netherlands East Indies (now Indonesia)
- New Granada (presumably meaning the Spanish colony or the Republic of New Granada, 1831–1858; now in Colombia and Panama)
- New Hebrides (now Vanuatu)
- Rhodesia (now Zimbabwe)
- South Vietnam (now Vietnam)
- Spanish Guinea (now Equatorial Guinea)
- Soviet Union (now divided into fifteen States)
- Zanzibar (now part of Tanzania)
- Zaire (now Democratic Republic of Congo)

== Purpose and legality ==
In 2011, the European Union resolved that a "non-exhaustive list of known fantasy and camouflage passports" should be drawn up that "should not be subject to recognition or non-recognition. They should not entitle their holders to cross the external borders and should not be endorsed with a visa". A list was subsequently published and last updated in October 2025.

== Sellers ==
The producers of camouflage passports are generally internet based businesses that specialise in producing various types of identity documents that may be in real or false names. Other services often offered include offshore company formation, introductions to offshore banking and financial services providers and similar services all targeted at international mobile individuals and those interested in avoiding tax and government regulation. Despite several companies withdrawing from this market in recent years, others continue to operate, offering passports that purport to include UV tags and holograms for verisimilitude.

== See also ==
- Fantasy passport
