= World Service Authority =

Organization promoting world citizenship

The flag of the WSA

The World Service Authority (WSA), founded in 1953 by Garry Davis, is a non-profit organization that claims to educate about and promote "world citizenship", "world law", and world government. It is best known for selling unofficial fantasy documents such as World Passports.

== Organization ==
The WSA has an office in Washington, D.C., the United States. The office in Shanghai, China, was closed on 1 January 2010. As of 2017, attorney David M. Gallup was the president of the WSA.

== History ==
The WSA was founded by Garry Davis, a former Broadway actor and World War II bomber pilot, who officially gave up his U.S. citizenship in 1948 to live as a "citizen of the world". It was set up to be the administrative agency of the "World Government of World Citizens" which he declared on 4 September 1953. The first office was opened in New York City in 1954. In the past, WSA also had offices in Basel, London and Tokyo.

== Activities ==
Besides selling World Passports, the WSA registers customers as "world citizens" and sells "world citizen" identity documents, such as fantasy birth certificates, identity cards, marriage certificates, political asylum cards, "International Exit Visas" and "International Residence Permits". The organization's legal department is responsible to assist holders of its documents. The organization also promotes programs, such as "Mundialization" – declaring cities and towns as "world territories"; "World Syntegrity Project" – an attempt to create a World Constitution through meetings of citizens; and other programs.

The WSA is also involved in a project to establish a World Court of Human Rights. The WSA has also allegedly sold World Government Postal Stamps, which, according to Garry Davis, helped to convey thousands of letters between China and Taiwan in the early 1980s.

== Recognition by countries ==
The World Service Authority claims that 189 countries have accepted the World Passport, by stamping a national visa and/or entry/exit stamp. The World Service Authority requests that travelers send photocopies or scans of visa/entry/exit stamps to the Washington, DC office. The World Service Authority also claims legal recognition of their documents by Burkina Faso, Ecuador, Mauritania, Tanzania, Togo and Zambia.

== See also ==
- Bitnation
- Commonwealth of World Citizens
- Sovereign citizen movement
- World Passport
- World Constitution and Parliament Association (WCPA)
