= List of former United States citizens who relinquished their nationality =

This is a list of notable former United States citizens who voluntarily relinquished their citizenship, and through that act, their nationality. It includes only public figures who completed the process of relinquishment of United States citizenship. This list excludes people who may have indicated their intent to do so but never formally completed the process, as well as immigrants who had their naturalizations canceled after convictions for war crimes or for fraud in the naturalization process.

== List ==
Key of reasons

To take or run for a position in a foreign government. Spouses of foreign heads of state are included in this category.
To naturalize as a citizen of a foreign country, or to retain citizenship in a foreign country disallowing dual citizenship.
To protest U.S. policies or actions
Other or unclear reasons

The column "Federal Register" refers to whether and when the former citizen's name was published by the U.S. government in one of its lists of people giving up citizenship. "Too early" refers to people who relinquished citizenship before publication began. An asterisk indicates that Federal Register data for the quarter in which the person relinquished citizenship has not yet been released. See the article "Quarterly Publication of Individuals Who Have Chosen to Expatriate" for further details on the Federal Register list. The column U.S. Citizenship indicates how the person original ascertained U.S. citizenship. Jus soli ("right of the soil") is citizenship by birth in the United States, whereas jus sanguinis ("right of blood") here refers to citizenship through birth abroad to an American parent.

Federal policy towards U.S. citizens who naturalize in foreign countries has varied over the years. For most of the twentieth century, the State Department regarded such naturalizations as indicating the intent to relinquish U.S. citizenship in almost all cases. However, in 1990 the State Department adopted the administrative presumption that "when a U.S. citizen obtains naturalization in a foreign state, subscribes to routine declarations of allegiance to a foreign state, or accepts non-policy level employment with a foreign state", they intend to retain U.S. citizenship, overriding the earlier presumption that such acts indicated intent to relinquish U.S. citizenship.

Name	Occupation	U.S. citizenship	Other citizenships	Description	Year emigrated	Year relinquished	Federal Register
James Abegglen	Scholar	Jus soli	Japan	A native of Michigan and a World War II Pacific theater Marine Corps veteran, Abegglen went on to a career as a professor of management and economics. He moved to Japan in 1982 and naturalized as a citizen of the country in 1997.	1982	1997	Q2 1998
Ljubica Acevska	Diplomat	Naturalized	Republic of Macedonia	A native of Capari in the former Yugoslavia, Acevska came to the United States with her family in 1966. She relinquished U.S. citizenship in 1995 to become the first Macedonian Ambassador to the United States.	N/A	1995	No
Valdas Adamkus	Politician	Naturalized	Lithuania	Adamkus was born in Kaunas, Lithuania, and came to Chicago as a refugee. He renounced U.S. citizenship in 1998 to become the President of Lithuania.	1997	1998	Q3 1998
Albert II, Prince of Monaco	Head of State	Jus sanguinis	Monaco	Born in Monaco in 1958, Prince Albert inherited U.S. citizenship from his mother, actress Grace Kelly. As a child he visited his U.S. relatives often, and later studied at Amherst College in Massachusetts. He relinquished his U.S. citizenship at age 21, and became Prince of Monaco in 2005.	N/A	1979-80	Too early
Tom Alter	Actor	Jus sanguinis	India	Alter was born in Mussoorie, Uttarakhand, India to American missionary parents. He lived in India all his life with the exception of a year-long stint at Yale University in the late 1960s; he withdrew without completing his degree and returned to India. After moving to Mumbai to pursue a Bollywood career, he renounced his U.S. citizenship and naturalized as an Indian citizen to demonstrate his commitment to the country and gain acceptance among fans.	N/A	1970s	Too early
David Alward	Politician	Jus soli	Canada	Alward was born in Beverly, Massachusetts, and moved to New Brunswick with his family while he was still young. He went on to become Premier of New Brunswick. He was named Canada's Consul-General in Boston in April 2015, and renounced U.S. citizenship to accept the post.	1960s	April 2015	Q3 2015
Kevin Andrews	Writer	Jus sanguinis	Greece	Andrews was born in China to American father Roy Chapman Andrews and his English wife, and served in the U.S.' 10th Mountain Division during World War II. After graduating from Harvard University in 1947, Andrews moved to Greece to pursue archaeological studies, and renounced his U.S. citizenship to naturalize as a Greek citizen in 1975.	1947	1975	Too early
Moshe Arens	Politician	Naturalized	Israel	Born in Lithuania in 1925, Arens came to the U.S. with his family in 1939, and naturalized as a U.S. citizen, but then emigrated to Israel to fight in the 1948 Arab–Israeli War. He kept U.S. citizenship while serving in the Knesset in the 1970s, as Israeli law did not yet bar legislators from dual citizenship at that time. He gave up U.S. citizenship before becoming Israeli ambassador in Washington in 1982.	1948	1982	Too early
Ted Arison	Businessperson	?	Israel	Born in the British Mandate of Palestine, Arison moved to the U.S. in 1952, where he founded Carnival Cruise Lines. He renounced his U.S. citizenship in 1990 to return to the land of his birth, which by then had become the State of Israel.	1990	1990	Too early
Debito Arudou	Activist	Jus soli	Japan	Raised as David Christopher Aldwinckle in Geneva, New York, he gave up his U.S. citizenship in 2002 after becoming a citizen of Japan. Columnist at The Japan Times and author of "Japanese Only -- The Otaru Hot Springs Case and Racial Discrimination in Japan", he advocates for minority rights in Japan, receiving his doctorate in International Studies at Meiji Gakuin University in 2014.	1991	2002	Q3 2002
William Ash	Writer	Jus soli	United Kingdom	Texas native Ash, angered by the U.S.' initial stance of neutrality in World War II, renounced citizenship in 1939 to join the Royal Canadian Air Force as a fighter pilot and flew numerous missions against Nazi Germany before his capture. Held as a prisoner of war at Stalag Luft III, he made more than a dozen escape attempts, survived the war, and was demobilised in England, where he settled and naturalized.	1939	1939	Too early
Rachel Azaria	Politician	Jus sanguinis	Israel	Azaria was born in Israel to an American mother who had made aliyah at age 18. She grew up in Israel, and never lived in the U.S. although she frequently visited relatives there. She renounced U.S. citizenship after being elected to the Knesset in the 2015 Israeli legislative election.	N/A	March 2015	Q4 2015
Josephine Baker	Musician	Jus soli	France	Born Freda Josephine McDonald in St. Louis, Missouri in 1906, she moved to Paris in 1925 to pursue a career as a dancer. She renounced U.S. citizenship to become a citizen of France in 1937.	1925	1937	Too early
Daphne Barak Erez	Judge	Jus soli	Israel	Barak-Erez was born to Israeli parents in the U.S. and later returned with them to Israel, where she grew up and attended Tel Aviv University. She was named a justice of the Supreme Court of Israel in January 2012, which required her to give up any foreign citizenship she held.	?	January 2012	Q2 2012
Tom Bayer	Financier	?	Vanuatu	Bayer served in the United States Army during the Vietnam War, and remained in the Asia-Pacific region to pursue a career in finance, moving to Australia in 1967 and then to Singapore before coming to Vanuatu (then the New Hebrides) in 1974. When Vanuatu became independent in 1980 and asked prominent members of society to take Vanuatu citizenship, Bayer accepted and gave up U.S. citizenship in 1982. He went on to become a member of the board of directors of the Reserve Bank of Vanuatu.	1960s	1982	Too early
Naftali Bennett	Politician	Jus sanguinis	Israel	Bennett was born in Israel to American émigré parents from California. He renounced U.S. citizenship after being elected to the 19th Knesset in the 2013 election.	N/A	January 2013	Q2 2013
Adam Bilzerian	Other	Jus soli	Saint Kitts and Nevis	Bilzerian, a writer and professional poker player, is a native of Tampa, Florida and the son of corporate takeover specialist Paul Bilzerian. Dissatisfied with the U.S. government's treatment of his father, who was tried for market manipulation in the early 1990s, and concerned over the direction of the country during the presidency of George W. Bush, Bilzerian emigrated from the U.S. and sought citizenship in Saint Kitts and Nevis.	2007	2008	No
Wayne Brabender	Athlete	Jus soli	Spain	Brabender was born in 1945 in Montevideo, Minnesota. He was drafted by the Philadelphia 76ers in 1967, but instead accepted an offer by Pedro Ferrándiz to join Real Madrid Baloncesto, and moved to Spain. He gave up U.S. citizenship to naturalize as a Spanish citizen so he could join the national basketball team, and went on to represent the country in the 1972, 1976, and 1980 Summer Olympics.	1967	1970s	Too early
Max Brauer	Politician	Naturalized	Germany	Brauer, a native of Germany, fled to France and then China after the Nazi rise to power, and eventually ended up in the U.S., where he worked as a university lecturer and was naturalized as a U.S. citizen. He travelled to Germany in June 1945 after the German surrender on a mission for the American Federation of Labor, and chose to renounce U.S. citizenship and resume his German citizenship so he could aid in reconstruction of Germany. He went on to become mayor of Hamburg in 1946.	June 1945	1946	Too early
Robert Brout	Scientist	Jus soli	Belgium	A native of New York and an expert in statistical mechanics, Brout met Belgian physicist François Englert while a professor at Cornell University in the 1950s. He resigned his position to move to Belgium to continue their research collaboration in 1961, and naturalized as a citizen of the country a few years later, giving up his U.S. citizenship in the process. The two, along with Peter Higgs, went on to win the 2004 Wolf Prize in Physics and the 2010 Sakurai Prize for their work on the Higgs boson. After Brout's death in 2011, Englert and Higgs shared the 2013 Nobel Prize in Physics (which is not awarded posthumously) for that same work.	1961	1960s	Too early
Bill Browder	Financier	Jus soli	United Kingdom	Born in Princeton, New Jersey in 1965, Browder emigrated to the United Kingdom in 1989. He founded Hermitage Capital Management there in Guernsey in 1996. He became a British citizen in 1997.	1989	1998	Q3 1998
Angela Brown-Burke	Politician	Naturalized	Jamaica	Born in Jamaica, Brown-Burke moved to the U.S. in 1986 and naturalized as a U.S. citizen in 1995, but two years later decided to return to Jamaica. She got involved in Kingston local politics with the People's National Party in the 2000s. She moved from local to national politics in January 2012 with her appointment as Deputy President of the Senate of Jamaica, and renounced her U.S. citizenship to take up the position.	1997	January 2012	Q2 2012
Yul Brynner	Actor	Naturalized	Switzerland	Russian-born film and stage actor; held dual Swiss and U.S. citizenship until 1965, when he renounced his U.S. citizenship for tax reasons; he had lost his tax exemption as an American resident abroad by working too long in the U.S. and would have been bankrupted by what he owed in taxes and penalties.	?	1965	Too early
Maria Callas	Musician	Jus soli	Greece	Opera singer born in New York City in 1923. She renounced U.S. citizenship in 1966 at the U.S. embassy in Paris in order to resume her ancestral Greek citizenship.	1937	April 1966	Too early
Orlan Calayag	Politician	Naturalized	Philippines	Calayag was born in San Pablo, Laguna, Philippines in 1974, and moved to Washington state after completing university. He naturalized as a U.S. citizen in 2009. Philippine Secretary of Agriculture Proceso Alcala, for whom Calayag had worked in the past, convinced him to move back to the Philippines and join the Department of Agriculture; Calayag renounced U.S. citizenship in January 2013 prior to becoming head of the National Food Authority.	2012	January 2013	Q2 2013
James Carney	Activist	Jus soli	Honduras	Carney, a native of Chicago and a World War II veteran, first went abroad as a missionary to British Honduras (today Belize) in 1955. He moved to Honduras in 1961. Eventually, his belief in liberation theology would lead him to naturalize as a Honduran citizen in September 1974 and then renounce U.S. citizenship as a gesture of support for landless peasants and a measure of protest against the United States' influence in the country. Despite his naturalization, he was deported from the country in 1979, but returned and then disappeared, believed to have either starved to death in the jungle or been killed by the Honduran military.	1961	1974	Too early
Vince Cate	Other	?	Mozambique	Cate, an encryption expert, moved to Anguilla in 1994 after completing a master's degree in computer science at Carnegie Mellon University. He renounced his U.S. citizenship in 1998, in his words, "to be free from the silly U.S. laws on crypto".	1994	September 1998	Q1 1999
Elizabeth Catlett	Artist	Jus soli	Mexico	Born in Washington, D.C. in 1915, Catlett first came to Mexico in 1946 to study the country's popular arts movements; there, she met the man who would become her husband, Francisco Mora. She naturalized as a Mexican citizen in 1962, and gave up her U.S. citizenship. She later faced difficulties getting a tourist visa to visit the U.S. due to her membership in the Taller de Gráfica Popular, a leftist arts group. She lived in Cuernavaca, Morelos until her death in 2012.	1946	1962	Too early
Alan Peter Cayetano	Politician	Jus sanguinis	Philippines	Cayetano was born in the Philippines in 1970 to Philippine Senator Renato Cayetano and his American wife, Sandra Schramm-Cayetano (a native of Michigan). He attended university in the Philippines, and renounced U.S. citizenship to stand for election to the Philippine House of Representatives in the 1998 elections, and to gain admission to the Philippine Bar that same month. He would go on to become the Philippine Senate Minority Leader.	N/A	1998	Q1 1999
Laura Cha	Politician	?	People's Republic of China (Hong Kong)	Cha renounced U.S. citizenship in 2001 to take up a position as Vice Chair of the China Securities Regulatory Commission.	?	February 2001	Q1 2001
Albert Chan	Scientist	Naturalized	People's Republic of China (Hong Kong)	A native of Taishan, Guangdong, Chan moved to Hong Kong at age 14 before going on to university in Japan and then the U.S., where he naturalized as a U.S. citizen. He moved to Taiwan in 1992 and then returned to Hong Kong in 1994. He renounced U.S. citizenship in 2001 after being named a fellow of the Chinese Academy of Sciences.	1992	2001	Q1 2002
Bernard Charnwut Chan	Politician	?	People's Republic of China (Hong Kong)	Chan was elected to the Legislative Council of Hong Kong in the 1998 elections to represent the insurance constituency. The Legislative Council Ordinance allows legislators in this and certain other functional constituencies to hold foreign citizenship; nevertheless, in the runup to the 2004 elections there was public discussion about amending the Ordinance to abolish this, and Chan renounced his U.S. and Thai citizenship to avoid controversy.	?	July 2004	Q2 2005
Bernard Chan Pak-li	Politician	?	People's Republic of China (Hong Kong)	Chan moved back to Hong Kong after receiving a Ph.D. from Duke University in 2003. He pursued a career in pharmaceuticals research before entering politics as a member of the Kwun Tong District Council. He renounced his U.S. citizenship in February 2013 after being nominated as the political assistant for the Commerce and Economic Development Bureau.	2003	February 2013	Q2 2013
Jaycee Chan	Actor	Jus soli	People's Republic of China (Hong Kong)	Born in Los Angeles, California, in 1982 to Jackie Chan and Joan Lin, Chan spent most of his childhood in Hong Kong. He attended college in the U.S., but dropped out to return to Hong Kong. He made his entertainment industry debut there in 2004. He renounced his U.S. citizenship in 2009 and became a PRC citizen, earning him praise in Chinese media for bucking the trend of Chinese actors obtaining Singaporean or other foreign passports.	N/A	February 2009	No
Victoria Chan-Palay	Scientist	?	Singapore	A native of Singapore, Chan-Palay studied at Smith College in Massachusetts, graduating in 1965. She and her then-husband Sanford Palay did seminal research in neuroscience in the 1970s; however, they later divorced. Chan-Palay moved to Switzerland and became a member of the faculty of the University of Zurich in 1989.	1989	2012	Q3 2012
Robert Chandran	Businessperson	Naturalized	India; Singapore	Born in India in 1950, Chandran attended university there and in the Philippines before moving to the U.S. in 1976 with his Filipina American wife Vivian. He naturalized as a U.S. citizen in 1981, and founded Chemoil that same year. In 2005 he moved himself and the company to Singapore to pursue opportunities in the Asian shipping market, and relinquished his U.S. citizenship in 2007 to become a citizen of Singapore.	2005	2007	No
Patrece Charles-Freeman	Politician	?	Jamaica	Charles-Freeman is the daughter of Jamaican politician Pearnel Charles. She lived in the U.S. while studying at the University of Miami and Florida International University, then returned to Jamaica to complete a doctorate at the University of the West Indies. She renounced U.S. citizenship in August 2011 so she could run as a Jamaica Labour Party candidate in the elections at the end of that year.	2000s	August 2011	No
Pearnel Patroe Charles Jr.	Politician	Jus soli	Jamaica	Charles is a Jamaican politician who currently serves as a Government Senator in the Parliament of Jamaica and as a Minister of State. He lived in the U.S. while studying at the George Washington University Law School and later was admitted to the New York State Bar. He then returned to Jamaica, where he continued practice as an attorney-at-law while serving as the deputy spokesperson for National Security for the Jamaica Labour Party who was then in Opposition He renounced U.S. citizenship in 2016.	2000s	2016	Q2 2017
Chen Be-yue	Judge	Naturalized	Republic of China	Chen left behind a career as a judge in Taiwan to emigrate to the U.S. in 1983, and naturalized as a citizen there in 1992. However, she later returned to Taiwan to resume her career as a judge, and relinquished her U.S. citizenship with her reinstatement by the Judicial Yuan. She obtained a U.S. green card in 2008 to make it easier for her to travel to the U.S. while caring for her granddaughter, but canceled it the following year. She would go on to become a member of the Council of Grand Justices.	1990s	1996	Q4 1996
Chen Pi-Chao	Politician	Naturalized	Republic of China	Chen left Taiwan in 1961 to attend Wayne State University and Princeton University, and then returned to WSU to become an instructor. He naturalized as a U.S. citizen in 1973, then returned to Taiwan in the 1990s and renounced U.S. citizenship in 1995 to enter politics. He thereafter served as a member of the National Security Council under Lee Teng-hui and as Vice-Minister of National Defense under Chen Shui-bian.	1990s	1995	Q2 1997
Fernando Cheung Chiu-hung	Politician	Naturalized	People's Republic of China (Macau and Hong Kong)	A native of Macau, Cheung grew up in Hong Kong, and moved to the U.S. for graduate school. He naturalized as a U.S. citizen, but returned to Hong Kong in 1996 to raise his developmentally challenged daughter. He renounced his U.S. citizenship to run in the 2004 LegCo elections, on a platform of improving social services for elderly and disabled people.	1996	2004	Q2 2005
Chi Cheng	Athlete; Politician	Naturalized	Republic of China	A native of Hsinchu, Taiwan, she won a bronze medal for the ROC team at the 1968 Summer Olympics. She naturalized as a U.S. citizen after marrying an American and living in the U.S., but returned to Taiwan in the 1970s. In 2009, President Ma Ying-jeou invited her to take up a policy advisor position in his government, which required her to give up U.S. citizenship.	1970s	2009	Q4 2009
David Chu	Politician	Naturalized	People's Republic of China (Hong Kong)	Chu was born in Shanghai in 1944, and moved to Bedford, Massachusetts with his parents in 1958. He relocated to Hong Kong in 1977 for career reasons, and became involved in local and mainland politics. He renounced U.S. citizenship in June 1994. He would go on to become a member of the Legislative Council of Hong Kong and the National People's Congress of the People's Republic of China.	1977	June 1994	JCT 1995, p. H17
Bruce Conde	Other	Jus soli	Yemen	A native of San Juan Capistrano, California, Conde went to Lebanon to study Arabic at the American University of Beirut in 1950, and eventually ended up in the Mutawakkilite Kingdom of Yemen, where in 1956 he renounced his U.S. citizenship to become an information officer in the government of Ahmad bin Yahya. After the Royalists lost the North Yemen Civil War, he fled to Spain and then Morocco, where he died a stateless man in 1992.	1950	1956	Too early
Winston Dang	Politician	?	Republic of China	Dang, a Democratic Progressive Party member in Taiwan, was named head of the Environmental Protection Administration by Chen Shui-bian after the 2004 elections, and renounced his U.S. citizenship to take up the position.	?	2005	Q1 2005
Kenneth and Robert Dart	Businessman	Jus soli	Belize, Cayman Islands, Ireland	In the mid-1990s Kenneth Dart and his brother, Robert, both renounced their American citizenship. Kenneth took Caymanian, Belizean and, later, Irish, citizenship. Robert holds Belizean and Irish citizenship, and resides in London. Kenneth Dart acquired citizenship of, and a compound in, the Cayman Islands, a tax haven.	?	1990s	
Garry Davis	Activist	Jus soli	None	Davis was born in Bar Harbor, Maine. After serving in the U.S. Army during World War II, Davis renounced his U.S. citizenship in 1948 in Paris in order to become a "citizen of the world", and created the first "World Passport".	?	1948	Too early
Quincy Davis	Athlete	Jus soli	Republic of China	Davis was born in Los Angeles, California. After graduating from Tulane University in 2006, he went on to play professional basketball in Europe and South America before coming to Taiwan in 2011 to join the Super Basketball League. He renounced his U.S. citizenship in June 2013 so he could naturalize in Taiwan and play for the Chinese Taipei men's national basketball team in the 2013 FIBA Asia Championship.	2006	June 2013	Q4 2013
Ron Dermer	Diplomat	Jus soli	Israel	Dermer was born in Miami Beach, Florida in 1971. He moved to Israel in 1996, and began the process of becoming a citizen there in 1997. In 2005, then-Finance Minister Benjamin Netanyahu appointed him Minister for Economic Affairs in the Israeli embassy in Washington, a post for which he had to renounce his U.S. citizenship.	1996	2005	Q2 2005
Michael D. Dingman	Businessperson	Jus soli	The Bahamas	Dingman was born in Connecticut in 1931. He moved to the Bahamas in 1964, and renounced U.S. citizenship in 1994 to become a citizen of the country. He denied that this was for reasons related to taxation.	1964	June 20, 1994	JCT 1995, p. H15
W. E. B. Du Bois	Scholar	Jus soli	Ghana	Du Bois, a native of Massachusetts, moved to Ghana in 1961 at age 93 to manage the Encyclopedia Africana project. The U.S. State Department refused to renew his passport while he was living there, so Du Bois chose to naturalize as a citizen of Ghana in 1963. Some sources claim that he renounced U.S. citizenship, but David Levering Lewis' biography of him states that he did not; instead, he lost it automatically under the law at the time upon voluntarily becoming a citizen of another country and swearing an oath of allegiance to it.	1961	1963	Too early
Miguel d'Escoto Brockmann	Politician	Jus soli	Nicaragua	D'Escoto, born in Los Angeles in 1933, went into politics in Nicaragua in the 1970s and renounced his U.S. citizenship. He held the post of Foreign Minister of Nicaragua from 1979–1980, as well as that of President of the United Nations General Assembly from 2008 to 2009.	?	1970s or earlier	Too early
T. S. Eliot	Writer	Jus soli	United Kingdom	Born in 1888 in St. Louis, Missouri, Eliot moved to the United Kingdom in 1914 to attend Merton College, Oxford. He married Briton Vivienne Haigh-Wood the following year, and rose to fame as a poet and playwright. He gave up U.S. citizenship in 1927 to become a British subject.	1914	1927	Too early
Princess Elizabeth of Yugoslavia	Royalty	Naturalized	Serbia	A native of Belgrade, Princess Elizabeth lived in the U.S. during her marriage to American clothier Howard Oxenberg, with whom she had a daughter, American actress Catherine Oxenberg. She moved to London after her marriage to Oxenberg ended, and married Briton Neil Balfour. Now living in Serbia, she is a political activist and one-time candidate for the presidency of Serbia. She renounced U.S. citizenship in 2012 and is listed in the Federal Register under her civil name Elizabeth Karageorgevic.	1960s	2012	Q2 2012
Max Ernst	Artist	Naturalized	France	Born in Germany in 1891, Ernst lived in France for most of his life. He fled the Nazi occupation in 1941 and came to the U.S., where he married Peggy Guggenheim and naturalized as a U.S. citizen; however, the two divorced in 1946, and four years later Ernst returned to France. He gave up his U.S. citizenship in 1958 to naturalize as a French citizen. He died in Paris in 1976.	1950	1958	Too early
Friedhelm Eronat	Businessperson	?	United Kingdom	German-born oil businessman	?	2003	Q3 2004
Eru	Musician	Jus soli	South Korea	Eru is the stage name of Cho Sung-hyun, a singer born in New York City to Korean immigrant parents. He dropped out of the Berklee College of Music in 2003 to move to South Korea and pursue his career as a singer there. He gave up U.S. citizenship in 2008 to take South Korean citizenship and serve in the army there.	2003	2008	No
Fredrik Herman Gade	Diplomat	Jus sanguinis	Norway	Gade was born at Frogner Manor in Norway in 1870 to American diplomat parents. At age 18 he moved to the United States, where he went on to marry an American woman and serve four terms as mayor of Lake Forest, Illinois. In 1910, after five years of service as Norway's honorary consul in Chicago, he decided to move back to Norway and renounce his U.S. citizenship to enter the Norwegian diplomatic service, though he was left stateless until he had fulfilled the two-year residency period in order to gain Norwegian citizenship.	1910	1910	Too early
John Paul Getty Jr.	Businessman	Naturalized	United Kingdom	Born at sea near Genoa, Kingdom of Italy in 1932, John Paul Getty Jr. inherited U.S. citizenship from his father, American-born British oil tycoon J. Paul Getty (1892–1976), who was once the richest man in the world. As a child he was initially raised in Los Angeles, California but due to his parents' divorce he moved with his mother to Reno, Nevada in 1936, and later studied at St. Ignatius College Preparatory and the University of San Francisco, both Jesuit schools in San Francisco. Getty was appointed Knight Commander of the Order of the British Empire (KBE) by The Queen in 1987 and relinquished his U.S. citizenship in December 1997, as he was granted British citizenship.	N/A	December 1997	No
Ashraf Ghani	Politician	Naturalized	Afghanistan	Ghani, a native of Logar Province, moved to the United States in 1977 to attend Columbia University, and pursued a career as an anthropologist there. He moved back to Afghanistan in 2002, where he served as President Hamid Karzai's Finance Minister until 2004. He renounced U.S. citizenship to run for President of Afghanistan in 2009, but was not elected.	2002	2009	Q3 2009
Terry Gilliam	Director	Jus soli	United Kingdom	Gilliam was born in Minneapolis. In 1968, he obtained British citizenship, then held dual U.S. and British citizenship for the next 38 years. In January 2006 he renounced his U.S. citizenship, describing the George W. Bush administration as having created an environment "scarily similar to the Orwellian nightmare" of his 1985 film Brazil.	1960s	January 2006	Q1 2006
Mike Gogulski	Activist	Jus soli	None	Gogulski, a political activist born in Phoenix, Arizona, moved to Eastern Europe in 2004 and then renounced his U.S. citizenship in 2008 in Slovakia without obtaining any other.	2004	December 2008	Q4 2010
Camillo Gonsalves	Diplomat; Politician	Jus soli	Saint Vincent and the Grenadines	Gonsalves was born in Philadelphia to Ralph Gonsalves and his Jamaican wife Sonia Gonsalves in 1971. He attended university and worked as a journalist and corporate lawyer in the U.S. before moving back to Saint Vincent and the Grenadines (SVG) to take a government post as a Senior Counsel. He lived in the U.S. again while serving as SVG's Permanent Representative to the United Nations, during which posting he retained his U.S. citizenship. He renounced his U.S. citizenship in September 2013, prior to being appointed a Senator in the House of Assembly.	1990s or 2000s	September 2013	Q2 2015
René González	Spy	Jus soli	Cuba	González was born in Chicago in 1956, but moved to Cuba as an infant. He returned to the U.S. in 1990 as a Cuban agent, posing as a defector. In 2001, he was convicted of spying on U.S. military facilities in South Florida and sentenced to prison as one of the "Cuban Five". He was released in 2011 and placed on probation for three years. In April 2013, during his second trip to Cuba since his release, he requested to be permitted to remain there with his family; the U.S. Justice Department agreed on the condition that he renounce his U.S. citizenship and thus his right to return to the country.	2013	May 6, 2013	No
Mr. and Mrs. William Gorham	Engineer	Jus soli	Japan	Gorham, a native of San Francisco, moved to Japan with his wife and children in 1918, where he worked as an engineer for various predecessors of Nissan before transferring to Hitachi. He and his wife renounced U.S. citizenship to naturalize as Japanese citizens in May 1941, apparently to escape increasing wartime restrictions on foreigners. He worked on jet engines at Hitachi during the war, while his son, who maintained his United States citizenship, moved to Washington, D.C. and joined the U.S. Office of Naval Intelligence.	1918	May 1941	Too early
Lindsay Grant	Politician	?	Saint Kitts and Nevis	Grant renounced U.S. citizenship in 2009, during the debate on the National Assembly Elections (Amendment) bill which would bar dual citizens from standing for election.	?	July 2009	Q4 2009
Ronald Green	Politician	?	Dominica	Green, a United Workers' Party politician, has been involved in Dominican politics since the 1990s. He renounced his U.S. citizenship to qualify for the 2009 election.	?	2009	Q3 2010
Eklil Ahmad Hakimi	Diplomat	Naturalized	Afghanistan	Hakimi was born in Kabul in 1968, and joined the Ministry of Foreign Affairs after graduating from the Polytechnical University of Kabul. As fighting in the Afghan civil war intensified, he emigrated to the United States in 1994, settling in Long Beach, California, where his parents and siblings already lived. He naturalized as a U.S. citizen but moved back to Afghanistan in 2002 and resumed his career in the transitional Afghan government. He renounced his U.S. citizenship in 2005 to take up a post as Afghanistan's ambassador to China. In 2011 he was named Afghanistan's ambassador to the United States.	2002	2005	No
Yaser Esam Hamdi	Other	Jus soli	Saudi Arabia	Hamdi was born in Baton Rouge, Louisiana to Saudi parents, and moved to Saudi Arabia with them as a child. He was captured in Afghanistan in 2001 and detained as a purported "illegal enemy combatant". In 2004, he was released to Saudi Arabia after agreeing to renounce his U.S. citizenship once he arrived there.	1980s	October 2004	Q4 2004
Han Ye-seul	Actor	Jus soli	South Korea	Han Ye-seul is the stage name of Leslie Kim, an actress born to Korean immigrant parents in southern California in 1981. She graduated from Cerritos College and then emigrated to South Korea, where she made her debut as a model in 2001. She renounced her U.S. citizenship in 2004 to take South Korean citizenship.	2001	March 2004	No
George Hatem	Medicine	Jus soli	People's Republic of China	Born in Buffalo, New York to Lebanese American parents in 1910, Hatem came to Shanghai in the 1930s to set up a medical practice. In 1949 he became the first foreigner to naturalize as a citizen of the People's Republic of China.	1930s	1949	Too early
Ian Hayles	Politician	Naturalized	Jamaica	Born in Westmoreland Parish, Jamaica, Hayles emigrated to the U.S. in the 1980s at age 13 with his family, and returned to Jamaica in 2000. He was elected to the Parliament of Jamaica in the September 2007 election, and renounced his U.S. citizenship the following month.	2000	October 2007	Q4 2007
William Heinecke	Businessperson	Jus sanguinis	Thailand	Heinecke was born in 1949 to a U.S. Foreign Service Officer and grew up in Japan, Hong Kong, and Malaysia. He came to Thailand in 1963 with his parents, and after graduating from the International School Bangkok remained in Thailand, first working in advertising before launching a hospitality industry business which grew into Minor International. He renounced U.S. citizenship in 1991 to naturalize as a Thai citizen.	N/A	1991	Too early
Stefan Heym	Writer	Naturalized	East Germany	A native of Chemnitz in eastern Germany, Heym fled from the Nazis in 1933 to Czechoslovakia before emigrating to the United States for further studies in 1935. He served in the U.S. Army during World War II and later naturalized as a U.S. citizen. He emigrated from the U.S. with his American wife in 1951, fearing investigation by the House Un-American Activities Committee. They first lived in Prague before finally settling in East Germany, where in 1953 he renounced his U.S. citizenship in protest of his former country's participation in the Korean War.	1951	1953	Too early
Alan Heyman	Scholar	Jus soli	South Korea	A native of New York City, Heyman first came to South Korea in 1953 during the Korean War, and developed an interest in Korean traditional music; he returned to the country in 1960 and devoted the rest of his life to musical research and composition, and received awards from UNESCO and the South Korean government in recognition of his work. He naturalized as a South Korean citizen in 1995, taking the name Hae Eui-man.	1960	1995	Q1 1997
Shere Hite	Scholar	Jus soli	Germany	Hite was born in Missouri. She went on to become a sex educator and feminist studies scholar. She moved to West Germany in 1987, stating that her decision was "my political protest, in line with many U.S. writers and intellectuals before me, [against] ... the growing clamping down on independent thought in the U.S." In 1995, she renounced her U.S. citizenship and became a German citizen.	1987	1995	Q1 2001
Robert Holley	Other	Jus soli	South Korea	A native of California, Holley first came to South Korea in 1978 as a Mormon missionary, and then returned in 1987 to pursue a legal career. He naturalized as a South Korean citizen in 1997, and later rose to fame as a television personality.	1987	1997	Q4 1997
Raffi Hovannisian	Politician	Jus soli	Armenia	Hovannisyan was born in Brentwood, California to Armenian-American parents. He moved to Armenia in 1989, and applied for citizenship there in 1991, which would require him to give up all foreign citizenships upon approval. However, the processing of his application was delayed for nearly a decade; in 2001, Hovannisyan forced the issue by renouncing his U.S. citizenship even without his Armenian citizenship approved, becoming stateless. President Robert Kocharyan then gave in to pressure and issued a decree granting Armenian citizenship to him.	1989	2001	Q3 2002
Hsiao Bi-khim	Politician	Jus sanguinis	Republic of China	Born in Japan in 1971 to a Taiwanese father and an American mother, she did her secondary and tertiary education in the U.S., where she became involved with the Democratic Progressive Party. In 1996, she moved back to Taiwan to become the party's Director of International Affairs. She renounced citizenship in the early 2000s in order to take up legislative office in Taiwan.	1996	2000s	Q2 2002
John Huston	Director	Jus soli	Ireland	Nevada, Missouri-born film director, screenwriter, and actor. He emigrated to Ireland in 1952 in disgust over the activities of the House Committee on Un-American Activities, and renounced U.S. citizenship in 1964 to become an Irish citizen.	1952	January 1964	Too early
Barbara Hutton	Other	Jus soli	Denmark; Dominican Republic	Hutton, a native of New York City, moved to Denmark in 1935 upon her marriage to Count Kurt von Haugwitz-Reventlow, and two years later renounced U.S. citizenship to take the Danish citizenship of her husband. Hutton lived in the U.S. again during her marriage to actor Cary Grant, which ended in 1945. In 1953 she became a citizen of the Dominican Republic through her marriage to her fifth husband Porfirio Rubirosa.	1935	January 1937	Too early
Toomas Hendrik Ilves	Politician	Naturalized	Estonia	Born in Sweden to Estonian émigré parents, Ilves grew up in New Jersey and naturalized as a U.S. citizen. He emigrated to Estonia and renounced his U.S. citizenship shortly after Estonia regained its independence with the dissolution of the Soviet Union, and went on to become the President of Estonia.	1990s	1990s	Too early
Frederic B. Ingram	Businessman	Jus soli	Ireland	Ingram renounced his US citizenship after his bribery jail sentence was commuted by President Jimmy Carter. He became an Irish citizen.	?	1981	Too early
Janet Jagan	Politician	Jus soli	Guyana	Born Janet Rosenberg, a native of Chicago, she emigrated to Guyana in 1943 with her husband, Indo-Guyanese politician Cheddi Jagan. She renounced U.S. citizenship in 1947 and in 1997 became the sixth president of Guyana.	1947	1950	Too early
Henry James	Writer	Jus soli	United Kingdom	A native of New York City, James traveled frequently between Europe and the U.S. before settling in England in 1876, where he became famous for novels about Americans living abroad such as Daisy Miller and The Portrait of a Lady. He renounced U.S. citizenship in 1915 and became a British subject to protest U.S. neutrality in World War I.	1876	July 1915	Too early
Said Tayeb Jawad	Diplomat	Naturalized	Afghanistan	Jawad, a native of the Republic of Afghanistan, fled the country in 1980 after the Soviet invasion, eventually ending up in the San Francisco Bay Area, where he naturalized as a U.S. citizen. In 2002, he responded to Hamid Karzai's call for help from the Afghan diaspora in rebuilding the country by moving back to Afghanistan and joining the new government. He renounced U.S. citizenship in 2003 in preparation for taking up a new post as Afghanistan's ambassador to the United States.	2002	2003	Q4 2003
Jang Young-sik	Scholar	Naturalized	South Korea	Born in Gwangju in 1935, Jang moved to the U.S. in the 1950s and naturalized as a U.S. citizen. He returned to South Korea in the 1980s when doing consulting work for the International Bank for Reconstruction and Development. He gave up U.S. citizenship and restored his South Korean citizenship in May 1998 to become president of the state-owned Korea Electric Power Company.	1980s	May 1998	Q3 1998
Alexis Jeffers	Politician	?	Saint Kitts and Nevis	Jeffers grew up on Nevis before coming to the U.S. to attend Broward College and Florida Atlantic University in Florida. In 2009, Saint Kitts and Nevis' new National Assembly Elections Act mandated that all candidates for elections swear at the time of their nomination that they lacked citizenship in any other country; Jeffers renounced his U.S. citizenship so he could stand in the January 2010 general election.	?	2009	Q4 2009
Jin Li	Scientist	Naturalized	People's Republic of China	Jin was born in Shanghai, and moved to the U.S. to earn his doctorate in genetics at the University of Texas Health Science Center at Houston, graduating in 1994. He moved back to Shanghai at the urging of his former professor Tan Jiazhen in 2005, and then renounced U.S. citizenship to resume his original Chinese citizenship.	2005	2006	No
Boris Johnson	Politician	Jus soli	United Kingdom	Johnson was born in New York City in 1964 to British parents, and the family returned to the United Kingdom in 1969. He was elected member of parliament in 2001 and mayor of London in 2008. In 2014, he unsuccessfully protested the imposition of capital gains tax by the United States on his home in London, and renounced U.S. citizenship in 2016 while becoming Foreign Secretary of the United Kingdom.	1969	2016	Q4 2016
Thomas Jolley	Activist	Jus soli	None	Born in Greensboro, North Carolina, Jolley moved to Canada in 1967 to avoid being drafted after receiving a draft to serve in the Vietnam War and renounced U.S. citizenship. He returned to the U.S. later that year. A federal appeals court found Jolley to be removable, but Canada refused to re-admit Jolley as he was not a citizen and had lost his landed immigrant status there, and so he went on living in the U.S. as a stateless person. He died in Asheville, North Carolina in 2014.	1967	1967	Too early
Meir Kahane	Politician	Jus soli	Israel	A native of Brooklyn, New York, Kahane emigrated to Israel in 1971, where he founded the political party Kach. He became a member of the Knesset on the Kach party list in the 1984 election. Renounced U.S. citizenship in September 1988, but expressed a desire to regain his U.S. citizenship just a month later, after his party was barred from the 1988 election.	1971	September 1988	Too early
Ojārs Ēriks Kalniņš	Diplomat	Naturalized	Latvia	A Latvian American and raised in the United States, after Latvia regained its independence in 1991, Kalniņš renounced his U.S. citizenship to become Latvia's ambassador in Washington in 1993. After his term as ambassador ended, he moved to Latvia to pursue a political career there, eventually becoming a member of the Saeima (parliament).	1999	1993	Too early
Mahmud Karzai	Politician; Businessperson	Naturalized	Afghanistan	The brother of Afghan president Hamid Karzai, he naturalized as a U.S. citizen but then moved back to Afghanistan in 2001 to pursue business opportunities. He renounced his U.S. citizenship in January 2013 in order to launch his political career in Afghanistan; he did not specify what position he would seek, though he stated he would not be a candidate in the 2014 presidential election.	2001	January 2013	Q1 2013
Fauzia Kasuri	Politician	?	Pakistan	A member of Pakistan Tehreek-e-Insaf, she renounced U.S. citizenship in March 2013 to run in the Pakistani general election that year.	?	March 2013	No
Donald Keene	Scholar	Jus soli	Japan	Born in 1922 in New York City, Keene served as a professor at Columbia University for over five decades. After his retirement, he moved to Japan in 2011 as a demonstration of his support for the country in the aftermath of the Tōhoku earthquake and tsunami. He obtained Japanese citizenship on March 8, 2012, which required him to relinquish his U.S. citizenship as a condition.	2011	March 2012	No
Kristina Keneally	Politician	Jus soli	Australia	Born in 1968 in Las Vegas, Nevada and raised in Whitehouse, Ohio, Keneally emigrated to Australia with her husband in 1994, and became a citizen there in 1999. She gave up U.S. citizenship to enter Australian politics, and went on to become 42nd Premier of New South Wales.	1994	2002	Q4 2002
Kuan Chung-ming	Politician	Naturalized	Republic of China	Kuan, a native of Taipei, studied in California in the 1980s, and obtained a green card and then U.S. citizenship. He moved back to Taiwan in 1994. He retained his U.S. citizenship while serving on the board of directors of Taiwan's central bank in 2002–2003, but renounced it in late 2011 before being appointed Minister Without Portfolio in the Executive Yuan during President Ma Ying-jeou's second term the following year.	1994	2011	Q1 2012
Pedro Pablo Kuczynski	Politician	Naturalized	Peru	Born in Peru in 1938, Kuczynski continued his higher education in the United Kingdom and the United States, where he later went into exile in 1969 due to political persecution. He remained in the United States working as an economist, and was naturalized in 1999. After returning to Peru in 2001, he was appointed Minister of Economy and Finance and later Prime Minister until 2006. He was a candidate for President of Peru in 2011. In 2015, he renounced his U.S. citizenship to demonstrate his commitment to Peru before running for president again in 2016, this time successfully.	June 2001	November 10, 2015	Q1 2017
Joseph Kurihara	Other	Jus soli	Japan	Kurihara was born in Kauai, Hawaii in 1895 to Japanese immigrant parents. He was interned due to his ethnicity at Manzanar and then Tule Lake during World War II, and renounced U.S. citizenship under the Renunciation Act of 1944 in protest of the internment. After the end of World War II, he emigrated to Japan; he never sought to restore his U.S. citizenship, and lived in Tokyo until his death in 1965.	1945	1944	Too early
Margaret Wade Labarge	Writer	Jus soli	Canada	Labarge was born in New York City in 1916. She married a Canadian whom she met while studying at St Anne's College, Oxford and moved to Canada with him in 1940. She later renounced U.S. citizenship to become a Canadian citizen in the belief that she should strive to become a full member of the society in which she lived rather than holding on to the country she left behind.	1940	1940s or later	Too early
Oskar R. Lange	Diplomat; Economist	Naturalized	Poland	Naturalized U.S. citizen born in Poland; renounced his citizenship in 1945 to take up a position as Poland's ambassador to the U.S., in a case believed to be the first of its kind in diplomatic history.	?	August 1945	Too early
John-Paul Langbroek	Politician	Jus sanguinis	Australia	Langbroek was born in Belgium to a Dutch father and American mother, and grew up in Australia. He gave up U.S. citizenship in 2001, and went on to become a Member of the Queensland Parliament.	N/A	2001	Q2 2002
Lawrence Lau	Scholar; Politician	Naturalized	People's Republic of China (Hong Kong)	Lau, a native of Guizhou, attended secondary school in Hong Kong before moving to the U.S. in 1960 for further studies, and pursued his academic career there for four decades before returning to Hong Kong in 2004 to become Vice-Chancellor of the Chinese University of Hong Kong. He renounced U.S. citizenship in January 2009 after being nominated to the Executive Council of Hong Kong.	2004	January 2009	Q2 2010
Christina Lee	Politician	?	People's Republic of China (Hong Kong)	Lee was born and raised in Hong Kong. She lived in the U.S. while attending high school, and then went on to University of Chicago where her parents had met, but afterwards moved to the United Kingdom before returning to Hong Kong in 1999. She relinquished U.S. citizenship in 2010, and went on to a variety of political positions in Hong Kong, including membership of the 1200-person Election Committee which picked the Chief Executive in 2012.	1997	2010	Q3 2010
Diane Lee Ching-an	Politician	Naturalized	Republic of China	Lee was born in Taiwan and naturalized as a U.S. citizen in 1991. She held elected public office in Taiwan since 1994, but resigned in 2009 due to accusations that she had maintained dual citizenship. She claims to have relinquished U.S. citizenship by taking up office in 1994; (Note: INA 349(a)(4) (8 U.S.C. § 1481(a)(4)) states that "accepting, serving in, or performing the duties of any office, post, or employment under the government of a foreign state or a political subdivision thereof, after attaining the age of eighteen years if he has or acquires the nationality of such foreign state" is one of the acts by which a U.S. national may lose nationality, if the act is performed voluntarily and with the intention of relinquishing U.S. nationality.) but did not file a request for determination of loss of nationality at the time, resulting in the later controversy.	1990s	1994 or later	Q4 2009
Jennifer Lee	Athlete	Jus soli	People's Republic of China (Hong Kong)	Born Jennifer Snow in Virginia, she moved to Hong Kong in 1994 with her husband, a Hong Kong native. She renounced U.S. citizenship in 2008 in order to naturalize as a Chinese citizen in Hong Kong so that she could represent Hong Kong at the 2008 Summer Olympics in equestrian; however, after she was naturalized, an injury to her horse forced her to withdraw from competition. She went on to represent Hong Kong at the 2010 Asian Games.	1994	July 2008	Q4 2009
Lee Kai-fu	Businessperson	Naturalized	Republic of China	A native of Taiwan, Lee moved to Tennessee at age 11, following his elder brother who already lived there, and later naturalized as a U.S. citizen. He moved to Beijing in 2005 to become Google China's first president, and in 2009 departed the company to found technology incubator Innovation Works. He renounced U.S. citizenship in 2011, and first discussed his renunciation publicly in an April 2013 post on Sina Weibo.	2005	2011	Q3 2011
Robert Lee	Medicine	Jus soli	Ghana	A native of South Carolina, Lee and his wife Sara emigrated to Ghana in 1956 and set up a dental practice, at the head of a wave of African Americans moving to the country to participate in nation-building as its independence neared. He naturalized as a Ghanaian citizen in 1963, renouncing his U.S. citizenship in the process. He remained in Ghana until his death in 2010.	1956	1963	Too early
Yuan T. Lee	Scientist	Naturalized	Republic of China	Born in Taiwan, he naturalized as a U.S. citizen, and won the Nobel Prize in Chemistry in 1986. He renounced U.S. citizenship after returning to Taiwan to take up a position with the Academia Sinica in 1994.	1994	1994	JCT 1995, p. H12
Jet Li	Actor	Naturalized	Singapore	Beijing-born film actor and martial artist. He moved to Singapore in 2007 for his children's schooling. He renounced U.S. citizenship in 2009 to naturalize as a citizen of Singapore.	?	2009	Q1 2009
Lin Ruey-shiung	Politician	Naturalized	Republic of China	A native of Tainan, Taiwan, Lin received a Doctorate of Public Health from Johns Hopkins University in the 1970s and remained in the U.S. until 1985. He renounced his citizenship in November 2011 to run as James Soong's VP on the People First Party ticket in the 2012 election.	1985	November 2011	Q1 2012
TC Lin	Filmmaker; Photographer; Writer	Jus soli	Republic of China	Born Thomas Christopher Locke, he is a native of the southern United States. He first came to Taiwan in 1988 to study at Tunghai University, and in 1994 renounced his U.S. citizenship to naturalize there. He went on to become well-known in Taiwan for his photography, filmmaking, and his 2003 book about his experiences in the Republic of China Army, Counting Mantou.	1988	September 12, 1994	JCT 1995, p. H17
Dov Lipman	Politician	Jus soli	Israel	A former resident of Silver Spring, Maryland, Lipman emigrated to Israel in 2005, and renounced his U.S. citizenship to be eligible to serve in the Israeli Knesset.	2005	January 2013	Q2 2013
Sacheen Littlefeather	Actress	Jus soli	Stateless	A resident of California, Littlefeather voluntarily relinquished her U.S. citizenship, together with seven other activists, in protest of the U.S. government response to the occupation at Wounded Knee. As the State Department did not respond, it is unknown whether or not Littlefeather's renunciation was valid and binding.	N/A	December 1972	No
Lo Ta-yu	Musician	Naturalized	Republic of China	Lo is a native of Miaoli, Taiwan and a formerly naturalized U.S. citizen. He rose to fame as a singer-songwriter in Taiwan in the 1970s. In May 2004, he held a concert in which he decried Dana Rohrabacher and Jim Ryun's H.Con.Res. 437 (calling on Taiwan to deploy troops in support of the American occupation of Iraq) and cut up his U.S. passport; the following week, he went to the para-consular American Institute in Taiwan (AIT) to renounce his U.S. citizenship.	?	May 2004	Q4 2004
Ivan Lozowy	Activist	Jus soli	Ukraine	Born in New York City in 1961, Lozowy moved to Ukraine in 1991 to work for the People's Movement of Ukraine, and later founded the Institute for Statehood and Democracy. He renounced U.S. citizenship in 1997 in the process of obtaining Ukrainian citizenship. He states that he is proud of his Ukrainian citizenship, as it helps him to feel closer to the people of Ukraine and fight against "the anti-national activities of the government".	1991	1997	Q4 1997
Marie-Chantal, Crown Princess of Greece	Royalty	Jus sanguinis	Greece	Born 1968 in London, Marie-Chantal inherited U.S. citizenship from her father, DFS co-founder Robert Warren Miller. She spent her childhood in Hong Kong and Paris, and moved to the U.S. in 1992 to enroll at New York University and to be closer to her future husband, Pavlos, Crown Prince of Greece, who was attending Georgetown University at the time. She withdrew from NYU to marry Pavlos in 1995, and then moved to London with him in 2002.	2002	2011	Q2 2011
Corine Mauch	Politician	Jus soli	Switzerland	Mauch was born in Iowa City, Iowa to Swiss parents, and returned to Switzerland with them in her early youth. She has lived in Zurich for over thirty years, and became a member of the City Council in the 1990s before being elected mayor in 2009.	1950s or 1960s	2012 or 2013	Q4 2013
Hiram Maxim	Engineer	Jus soli	United Kingdom	A native of Sangerville, Maine, Maxim began his career as an inventor in Massachusetts before emigrating to the United Kingdom in 1881 to pursue the development of what would eventually come to be known as the Maxim gun. He gave up his U.S. citizenship to naturalize as a British subject in 1900.	1881	1901	Too early
Jeremy Menuhin	Musician	Jus soli	United Kingdom	The son of violinist Yehudi Menuhin, Jeremy Menuhin was born in San Francisco, California, but followed his parents to Europe, where he studied at Eton College and made his debut as a pianist with the London Philharmonic Orchestra. He pursued his musical career in both Europe and North America for some decades before relinquishing U.S. citizenship in 2003.	?	2003	Q2 2003
Yehudi Menuhin	Musician	Jus soli	Switzerland; United Kingdom	Menuhin, a world-famous violinist, was born in New York City in 1916, but lived and worked in Europe for most of his life. He obtained honorary Swiss citizenship in 1970, and British citizenship in 1985, in both cases without relinquishing U.S. citizenship. However, he renounced U.S. citizenship in 1994, and died five years later in Germany.	?	April 7, 1994	JCT 1995, p. H10
Carl Ferris Miller	Other	Jus soli	South Korea	Miller, a native of Pittston, Pennsylvania, first came to Korea in 1945 with the United States Navy, and naturalized as a South Korean citizen in 1979. The founder of South Korea's first privately established botanical garden, he lived in the country until his death in 2002.	1945	1979	Too early
Mina	Musician	Jus soli	Japan	Mina Myoi, known mononymously as Mina, a member of South Korean idol group Twice, was born in San Antonio, Texas, to Japanese parents. She moved to Japan as a toddler and relinquished her US citizenship in order to satisfy Japan's requirement that dual citizens by birth must choose a nationality before the age of 22.	early 2000s	2019 or earlier	Q3 2019
Akierra Missick	Politician	Jus soli	British Overseas Territories (Turks and Caicos Islands)	Missick was born in the U.S.; she did her primary education in the Turks and Caicos Islands before returning to the U.S. briefly to attend high school at MAST Academy in Florida, and then moved to the United Kingdom for further studies. After her graduation, she moved back to the Turks and Caicos Islands, where she became a member of the Progressive National Party. She renounced her U.S. citizenship on October 17, 2012, to be eligible to run in the 2012 general election.	1990s	October 17, 2012	Q3 2013
Keith Mitchell	Politician	Naturalized	Grenada	Mitchell was born in Grenada, West Indies. He naturalized as a U.S. citizen in January 1984. A member of the New National Party, he became the Prime Minister of Grenada in 1995. The U.S. State Department made a determination in 2001 that Mitchell had relinquished his U.S. citizenship by becoming PM in 1995.	?	1995	Q4 2001
J. Mark Mobius	Financier	Jus soli	Germany	Mobius was born in Hempstead, New York to German and Puerto Rican parents. He went on to a career as an investor and emerging markets fund manager, moving to Hong Kong in 1969 to establish Mobius Incorporated. Mobius was entitled to German citizenship by descent; he renounced his U.S. citizenship and became a German citizen.	1969	1995 or earlier	Q1 2001
Luis Alberto Moreno	Diplomat	Jus soli	Colombia	Moreno was born in Philadelphia, Pennsylvania, to a Colombian father attending medical school at the University of Pennsylvania. He did his early education in Colombia before coming to the U.S. for further studies. He renounced U.S. citizenship in 1998 after President Andrés Pastrana Arango named him Colombia's ambassador to Washington.	1980s	1998	Q3 1998
Chris Nam	Politician; Businessperson	Naturalized	South Korea	Nam was born in Uiseong, Gyeongsangbuk-do, South Korea in 1954. He moved to Southern California in 1982, where he worked in real estate and also served in Korean American community organizations. He moved back to South Korea and gave up his U.S. citizenship in 2011 to pursue political ambitions with South Korea's Grand National Party (now Saenuri Party).	2011	September 2011	Q2 2012
Claire Negrini	Other	Jus soli	Italy	Negrini, a native of Chicago, fell in love with a Roman Catholic priest and moved to his native Italy to be with him in 1951. She renounced U.S. citizenship in order to avoid deportation, and obtained an official declaration of statelessness from a Milan court. The priest was laicized to marry her; the two were excommunicated. Under Italian nationality law, she became an Italian citizen through the marriage. The two later tried to move to California at the invitation of an organisation there, but this was thwarted by Negrini's renunciation of U.S. citizenship, and they settled in Chihuahua, Mexico instead.	1951	1951	Too early
Marshall Nicholson	Financier	Jus soli	People's Republic of China (Hong Kong)	Nicholson migrated from New York City to Hong Kong in 2002, where in 2007 he would go on to become vice-chairman of BOC International's investment banking division, the first senior foreign executive in any Chinese bank. He renounced U.S. citizenship in 2013 after the Hong Kong Immigration Department approved his naturalization; applicants for naturalization in Hong Kong are not permitted to retain their previous citizenships.	2002	April 2013	Q4 2013
Henry Martyn Noel	Activist	Jus soli	None	Princeton, New Jersey native who served as an ambulance driver in World War II. Concerned by a "climate of nationalism" in the U.S., he renounced his citizenship while working in France in 1948 and moved to Allied-occupied Germany, where he took a job as a construction worker and lived on German rations. Fellow renunciant Garry Davis would later mention Noel's actions as inspiration for his own renunciation.	1940s	February 1948	Too early
Queen Noor of Jordan	Royalty	Jus soli	Jordan	Born Lisa Halaby in Washington, D.C. in 1951, she became a Jordanian citizen upon her marriage to King Hussein of Jordan in 1978. She claims she automatically lost U.S. citizenship by obtaining Jordanian citizenship, but that she did not renounce it.	1978	1978	Too early
Lobo Nocho	Musician	Jus soli	France	A native of Philadelphia, Nocho moved to Canada in 1941, where he enlisted in the Canadian Army. He returned to the United States briefly when he transferred to the U.S. Army, but was quickly shipped off to Europe, just in time to see service during the Normandy landings. After World War II ended, he settled in France and began a career as a jazz singer at Paris nightclubs, one of numerous African Americans in France who pursued similar paths. He renounced U.S. citizenship in 1950 after becoming a French citizen.	1944	1950	Too early
Victor Okaikoi	Politician	?	Ghana	Okaikoi, a former Ghana Army captain, renounced his U.S. citizenship in August 2012 in order to run in the 2012 Ghanaian parliamentary election as a candidate for the Odododiodio constituency of the Accra Metropolis District.	?	August 2012	No
Christina Onassis	Other	Jus soli	Greece; Argentina	Onassis was born in New York City in 1950 to businessman Aristotle Onassis, a Greek and Argentine citizen. She grew up in France and Greece. After her father's death in 1975, she renounced U.S. citizenship and donated the American portion of her holdings in her father's company to the American Hospital of Paris.	1950s	June 1975	Too early
Kimi Onoda	Politician	Jus soli	Japan	Kimi Onoda was born in Chicago, Illinois, to an American father and a Japanese mother, and moved to Japan as a child. Controversy arose in Japan because she mistakenly had not properly renounced U.S. citizenship at the time of her election to the House of Councillors in 2016. Onoda apologized for her mistake and officially renounced her citizenship through the U.S. government in 2017.	1983	2017	No
Oona O'Neill	Other	Jus soli	United Kingdom	Daughter of American playwright Eugene O'Neill. Emigrated from the U.S. to the United Kingdom in 1952 to join her husband Charlie Chaplin after he was accused of "Communist sympathies" and denied re-entry to the U.S. that year; renounced U.S. citizenship to become a British subject in 1954.	1952	1954	Too early
Michael Oren	Diplomat; Historian	Jus soli	Israel	Oren was born in New York City in 1955 and raised in New Jersey. He emigrated to Israel in 1979, where he went on to become a historian, military officer and diplomat. He relinquished his U.S. citizenship in May 2009 upon taking up his new position as Israel's ambassador to the United States.	1979	May 2009	Q3 2009
Vartan Oskanian	Politician	Naturalized	Armenia	Oskanian was born in Syria in 1955, and graduated from the Yerevan Polytechnic Institute in 1979 before moving to Massachusetts to study at Tufts University. He went on to become the editor of an Armenian American newspaper in Los Angeles, but by 1992 had moved back to Armenia to join the Ministry of Foreign Affairs. He gave up U.S. citizenship in 1998 to become head of that ministry under Prime Minister Robert Kocharyan's administration.	1992 or earlier	1998	Q4 2002
Andreas Papandreou	Politician	Naturalized	Greece	A naturalized U.S. citizen, he renounced in 1964 to run in the 1964 Greek legislative election, and went on to become the Prime Minister of Greece.	?	1964	Too early
Park Jong-sei	Scientist	Naturalized	South Korea	Park came to the U.S. in 1966 to pursue graduate studies at the University of Rochester. He moved back to his native South Korea in 1986, and renounced U.S. citizenship in 1996 when he joined South Korea's Food and Drug Administration.	1986	1996	Q2 1997
Ion Perdicaris	Other	Jus soli	Greece	The son of a Greek immigrant, Perdicaris was born and raised in South Carolina. With the onset of the American Civil War, he moved to Athens, Greece and registered himself as a Greek subject so that he would not have to serve in the Confederate States Army. He later lived in England, Germany, and Morocco.	1862	1862	Too early
Ryan Pinder	Politician	Jus sanguinis	The Bahamas	Bahamian politician; renounced U.S. citizenship derived at birth from his American mother in February 2010.	?	February 2012	Q1 2010
Georgi Pirinski, Jr.	Politician	Jus soli	Bulgaria	Born in New York City to immigrant parents in 1948, but left the country with them for Bulgaria when they were expelled in 1953; renounced U.S. citizenship in 1974, although political opponents have questioned the validity of his renunciation.	1953	1974	Too early
Sam Pitroda	Politician	Naturalized	India	Pitroda moved to the U.S. in 1964 for graduate studies at the Illinois Institute of Technology. He moved back to India in 1981 and later renounced U.S. citizenship to take up a position in Rajiv Gandhi's government as a science adviser.	1981	1984	Too early
Mary Grace Poe Llamanzares	Politician	Naturalized	Philippines	The adopted daughter of actors Fernando Poe, Jr. and Susan Roces, Poe moved to the U.S. to study at Boston College. After living in the U.S. for some time, she moved back to the Philippines in 2004, and renounced U.S. citizenship prior to becoming chairwoman of the Movie and Television Review and Classification Board in 2010. She was later elected to the Senate of the Philippines.	2004	2010	Q4 2011
Kitty Poon	Politician	Naturalized	People's Republic of China (Hong Kong)	Poon, a native of Hangzhou, immigrated to Hong Kong after her middle school graduation. She moved to the U.S. in 1989 for further studies, and naturalized as a citizen there before returning to Hong Kong in 1997. She was appointed Undersecretary for the Environment Bureau under the Political Appointments System in May 2008. Though the Hong Kong Basic Law does not forbid undersecretaries to hold foreign passports, she renounced her U.S. citizenship the following month in order to avoid public controversy.	1997	June 2008	No
Rao Yi	Scientist	Naturalized	People's Republic of China	Born in 1962 in Jiangxi, Rao came to the U.S. in 1985 for graduate studies at the UC San Francisco, and later naturalized as a U.S. citizen. He moved back to China in 2007 to become dean of Peking University's School of Life Sciences, and renounced his U.S. citizenship in 2009.	2007	2009	Q2 2012
Cathy Reed	Athlete	Jus soli	Japan	Reed was born in Kalamazoo, Michigan to an American father and Japanese mother, a dual national at birth. Japanese nationality law requires those born dual citizens to renounce one citizenship or the other by age 22; Reed chose Japanese citizenship to continue representing Japan in ice dancing.	?	2009	No
Denise Eisenberg Rich	Other	Jus soli	Austria	Born in Worcester, Massachusetts in 1944 to an Austrian immigrant father, Rich rose to fame in the U.S. as a songwriter and socialite. In 2011, she moved to London and renounced U.S. citizenship to be closer to her husband and family, according to her lawyer. She is listed in the Federal Register under her maiden name Denise Eisenberg.	?	November 2011	Q1 2012
Glen L Roberts	Activist	Jus soli	None	Roberts, a privacy activist was born in Ann Arbor, Michigan. He moved to Latin America in 2002. In June 2013, he renounced his U.S. citizenship at the U.S. Consulate in Asuncion, Paraguay, and became stateless.	2002	June 2013	Q4 2014
Shawn Richards	Politician	?	Saint Kitts and Nevis	Richards renounced U.S. citizenship in 2009, during the debate on the National Assembly Elections (Amendment) bill which would bar dual citizens from standing for election.	?	July 2009	Q4 2009
Shahine Robinson	Politician	Naturalized	Jamaica	Born in Jamaica, Robinson lived in the U.S. intermittently from 1978 to 2001. She naturalized as a U.S. citizen in 2006, while a sitting member of the Parliament of Jamaica. In 2010, she was removed from her seat by court order, but then renounced her U.S. citizenship and won her seat back in a by-election. She is listed in the Federal Register under her maiden name Shahine Fakhourie.	2001	December 2010	Q3 2011
Viphandh Roengpithya	Engineer; Businessperson	?	Thailand	Roengpithya was born in Bangkok, and studied there and in London before coming to the U.S. in the late 1960s, where he worked in integrated circuit design. He returned to Thailand when his mother fell ill, and chose to make his return permanent. He founded the Asian University of Thailand in Chonburi Province in 1993. According to State Department records, he relinquished his U.S. citizenship the following year.	?	December 14, 1994	JCT 1995, p. H37
Daniel Sandrin	Athlete	Jus soli	South Korea	Born to a Korean American mother and Italian American father, he graduated from Seattle Pacific University in 2003 and played basketball professionally in Luxembourg and Germany before coming to South Korea in 2006. He naturalized as a South Korean citizen and relinquished U.S. citizenship in June 2006 in an effort to meet eligibility requirements to play for his team. His elder brother Eric Sandrin followed him to South Korea and, in 2009, also naturalized as a South Korean citizen.	2003	June 2006	No
Eric Lee Sandrin	Athlete	Jus soli	South Korea	Born Eric Lee Sandrin in 1978 to a Korean American mother, he grew up in the Pacific Northwest. His basketball career took him all over the world, including to teams in Luxembourg, Brazil, and Singapore. He eventually followed his younger brother to South Korea, and naturalized as a citizen there in 2009 so he could represent his new country at the Asian Games the following year.	2000s	2009	Q3 2009
Eduardo Saverin	Businessperson	Naturalized	Brazil	A native of Brazil, Saverin moved to the U.S. as a child in 1992 and became a U.S. citizen in 1998. While attending Harvard University, he played a role in the founding of Facebook. He moved to Singapore in 2009, and renounced his U.S. citizenship in September 2011.	2009	September 2011	Q1 2012
Yolanda Schakron	Politician	Naturalized	Belize	Born in Guatemala, Schakron became a naturalized U.S. citizen at age 15 along with her parents, thus holding dual citizenship, but later returned to her parents' native Belize. She renounced her U.S. citizenship in February 2012 in order to run as a People's United Party legislative candidate in the election the following month.	?	February 2012	No
Edward Seaga	Politician	Jus soli	Jamaica	Seaga was born in Boston, Massachusetts, in 1930 to Jamaican parents of Lebanese background, but grew up in Kingston. He renounced his U.S. citizenship in the 1950s to demonstrate his loyalty to Jamaica, and went on to become Prime Minister in 1980.	1930s	1950s	Too early
Ishaq Shahryar	Diplomat	Naturalized	Afghanistan	A native of Afghanistan, Shahryar received a scholarship to study chemistry in the U.S. in 1956, and remained in the U.S. after his graduation to work on solar energy projects with NASA. He later naturalized as a U.S. citizen. He renounced U.S. citizenship in 2002 when Hamid Karzai appointed him Afghanistan's new ambassador to the United States.	2002	June 2002	Q3 2002
Sidney Shapiro	Writer	Jus soli	People's Republic of China	Born in Brooklyn, New York in 1915, Shapiro moved to China in 1947, where he worked for the Foreign Languages Press as a translator of Chinese literature. He gave up his U.S. citizenship to become a Chinese citizen in 1963.	1947	1963	Too early
Sam Shepherd	Athlete	Jus soli	Venezuela	Shepherd was born in La Grange, North Carolina, and played basketball for Delaware State. After graduating, he moved to Venezuela to continue his sports career in the Liga Profesional de Baloncesto. He naturalized as a Venezuelan citizen and gave up U.S. citizenship in 1986 to join the Venezuela national basketball team, as a member of which he represented the country at the 1992 Tournament of the Americas and the 1992 Summer Olympics.	1970s	1986	Too early
Yigong Shi	Scientist	Naturalized	People's Republic of China	Shi, a graduate of Tsinghua University in Beijing, went to U.S. for his Ph.D studies at Johns Hopkins University in the 1990s, and naturalized as a U.S. citizen. In 2003, he took up a professorial position at Tsinghua. In 2008, he moved back to China full-time, and the following year became Dean of Tsinghua's School of Life Sciences. He renounced his U.S. citizenship in 2011.	2008	2011	Q3 2011
Robert Sikol	Politician	Jus soli	Vanuatu	Born Robert Bohn in California, he moved to Vanuatu in 1978, and gave up U.S. citizenship in 1997 to naturalize as a citizen of Vanuatu. He acquired the name "Sikol" upon his ceremonial adoption by a native family. He went on to become the first naturalized member of the Parliament of Vanuatu in the 2012 elections.	1978	1997	Q2 1999
Ernest Simpson	Ship broker and second husband of Wallis Simpson, who later became the Duchess of Windsor.	Jus soli	United Kingdom	Born in New York City, he moved to London as a young adult where he served in the British Army during World War I. He renounced his U.S. citizenship shortly after the end of the war in order to naturalize as a British Subject.	Too early	Too early	Too early
Song Ja	Scholar	Naturalized	South Korea	Song was born in Daejeon in 1936, and came to the U.S. in 1960 to study at Washington University in St. Louis. He received U.S. permanent residence in 1970 and naturalized as a U.S. citizen, but returned to South Korea to take up a professorship at his alma mater Yonsei University in 1977. He gave up U.S. citizenship in 1984, and would go on to become chancellor of Yonsei University in 1994 and Minister of Education in 2000.	1970s	1984	Too early
Balaji Srinivasan	Entrepreneur	Jus soli	Singapore	Srinivasan is a New York-born entrepreneur who co-founded the genetic testing company Counsyl, moved to Singapore in 2020, and created the Network School.	2020	2023	Q3 2023
Barbara Stcherbatcheff	Writer	Jus soli	United Kingdom	Stcherbatcheff is a Chicago-born writer and best-selling author. She moved to London after graduating from university and naturalized as a British citizen. She renounced her U.S. citizenship in 2014.	2004	2014	Q2 2015
Michael Stern	Politician	?	Jamaica	Stern was elected to the Parliament of Jamaica in 2007. In 2009 it came to light that he was a dual citizen of the U.S. and Jamaica and thus not eligible to sit in Parliament; he then renounced his U.S. citizenship and won back his seat in a by-election.	?	2009	No
Takamiyama Daigorō	Athlete	Jus soli	Japan	Born Jesse James Wailani Kuhaulua in Hawaii, he moved to Japan in 1964 to pursue a career in sumo. He naturalized as a Japanese citizen and then relinquished his U.S. citizenship in 1976 when the Japan Sumo Association instituted a new requirement that only Japanese citizens could be promoted to the rank of toshiyori (sumo elder) and run their own stables.	1964	1976	Too early
Sir John Marks Templeton	Financier	Jus soli	United Kingdom; The Bahamas	Templeton was born in Winchester, Tennessee. He renounced his U.S. citizenship in 1968 to become a Citizen of the United Kingdom and Colonies, also later acquiring Bahamian citizenship after the territory became an independent country. Templeton's renunciation had significant tax benefits, though he stated his emigration was motivated by the desire to get away from the pressures of Wall Street in order to improve his investment decision-making process. He lived in the Bahamas until his death in 2008.	1968	1968	Too early
Tien Hung-mao	Diplomat; Scholar	Naturalized	Republic of China	Tien came to the U.S. in the 1960s to attend the University of Wisconsin–Madison, and thereafter was a university professor for more than 20 years. After moving back to Taiwan, he refused two invitations by Lee Teng-hui to join Taiwan's government, before accepting an appointment as Minister of Foreign Affairs under Chen Shui-bian in 2000. He renounced U.S. citizenship eight days before taking the post. He later became Taiwan's representative to the United Kingdom.	1990s	2000	No
Tsay Ting-kuei	Politician; Activist	Naturalized	Republic of China	Tsay, a native of Kaohsiung, came to the United States in 1978 to pursue a Ph.D. at Cornell University. Taiwan's government blacklisted him due to his support for the Tangwai movement, leaving him unable to return home, so he remained in New York State and naturalized as a U.S. citizen. After the end of martial law in Taiwan, he moved back to the island in 1990, and renounced U.S. citizenship in 2002 to become vice-chairman of Taiwan's Environmental Protection Administration.	1990	2002	Q3 2002
Earl Tupper	Businessperson	Jus soli	Costa Rica	Tupper was born in Berlin, New Hampshire, and founded the Tupperware company in 1938. In 1958, shortly after selling his company and divorcing his wife, he bought an island off Costa Rica and renounced his U.S. citizenship to avoid taxes.	?	1958	Too early
Tina Turner	Musician	Jus soli	Switzerland	Turner was born in 1939 in Nutbush, Tennessee, and rose to international fame as a singer. She began dating German music executive Erwin Bach in 1985, and moved to Zürich with him in 1994. Her application for Swiss citizenship was approved in April 2013, and she confirmed her relinquishment of U.S. citizenship to the U.S. Embassy in Bern in October 2013.	1994	October 24, 2013	Q1 2014
Bernard Utchenik	Engineer; Restaurateur	Jus soli	Singapore	Born in Detroit, Utchenik's work in petroleum engineering brought him to Asia in 1991. He settled in Singapore five years later, where he founded the American-style food chain Botak Jones in 2003. He naturalized as a Singaporean citizen in August 2009.	1991	August 28, 2009	Q4 2009
Daryl Vaz	Politician	Jus sanguinis	Jamaica	Born in Jamaica to a Puerto Rican mother, Vaz was elected to the Parliament of Jamaica while still holding U.S. citizenship, which he formally renounced in 2008 after a challenge to his eligibility.	?	April 2008	No
Roger Ver	Businessperson	Jus soli	Saint Kitts and Nevis	Ver moved to Tokyo, Japan in 2005. He used money he earned from Bitcoin investments to purchase property in Saint Kitts and Nevis and become a citizen of the country through its economic citizenship program, and then gave up U.S. citizenship in March 2014.	2005	March 2014	No
Danville Walker	Politician	?	Jamaica	Walker grew up in Kingston, Jamaica, and served as Jamaica's Director of Elections and Commissioner of Customs. He renounced his U.S. citizenship to run as a Jamaica Labour Party candidate in the 2011 election.	?	November 2011	No
Oliver Wallop, 8th Earl of Portsmouth	Politician	Naturalized	United Kingdom	A native of England, Wallop moved to Sheridan, Wyoming, became a rancher, and naturalized as a U.S. citizen in 1891. His four elder brothers all died without male heirs, the last in 1922, so he returned to the United Kingdom in 1925 to take up his title. He renounced his U.S. citizenship in 1933 to take his seat in the House of Lords.	1925	1933	Too early
Everald Warmington	Politician	?	Jamaica	Warmington was born and raised in Browns Hall, Saint Catherine Parish, Jamaica. He joined the Jamaica Labour Party and was first elected to the Parliament of Jamaica in the 2002 elections. In 2011 it came to light that he had been a dual citizen at the time of his nomination and was thus ineligible to sit in Parliament. Warmington had already renounced his U.S. citizenship by that point; he resigned from his seat and was returned unopposed in a by-election.	?	2011	Q3 2011
Sharon Hay Webster	Politician	Jus soli	Jamaica	Webster was born in 1969 in Glen Ridge, New Jersey, but raised in Jamaica, and naturalized there in 1988. She was elected to Parliament in 1997. In 2008, the dual nationality of a number of Jamaican politicians became a public issue; Webster eventually announced in 2009 that she would renounce U.S. citizenship, but the 2010–2011 U.S. diplomatic cables leak revealed she had not. Later that year, Webster carried out her renunciation, receiving a Certificate of Loss of Nationality on October 27, 2011.	1969	2011	No
Myron W. Wentz	Businessperson	?	Saint Kitts and Nevis	Founder of USANA Health Sciences.	?	2007 or earlier	No
Dorothy Payne Whitney	Activist	Jus soli	United Kingdom	New York City-born social activist; moved to the United Kingdom and then renounced U.S. citizenship in 1935.	?	April 25, 1935	Too early
Harmon Wilfred	Activist; Businessperson	Jus soli	None	A Denver-area real estate businessman frustrated by fruitless efforts to draw attention to alleged corruption and malfeasance by the Resolution Trust Corporation in the aftermath of the 1980s savings and loan crisis, Wilfred emigrated to Canada and then New Zealand, where he renounced his U.S. citizenship in 2005. He has applied for New Zealand citizenship, but continues to face immigration difficulties in his new country of residence.	1990s	2005	Q3 2005
Edward Wilson	Writer	Jus soli	United Kingdom	A native of Maryland, Wilson served in the Vietnam War and then moved to Europe, eventually settling in Suffolk, England in 1974. He gave up U.S. citizenship in 1983 after becoming a British citizen. He later went on to a career as a writer of spy fiction.	1970s	1983	Too early
Robin Winkler	Activist	Jus soli	Republic of China	Born in the U.S. in 1954, Winkler emigrated to Taiwan in 1977. He renounced U.S. citizenship to naturalize as a Republic of China citizen in 2003. A lawyer and environmental activist, he is involved with the Green Party Taiwan, though due to constitutional limitations he is not eligible to run as a legislative candidate until 10 years after naturalizing.	1977	2003	Q4 2003
Flora Wovschin	Spy	Jus soli	Soviet Union	Born in New York City, Wovschin worked for the U.S. government in the Office of War Information and later the Department of State, and began spying for the Soviet Union. She married an employee of Soviet trading firm Amtorg, moved to Russia with him after World War II, and gave up U.S. citizenship to become a Soviet citizen. She is believed to have died in North Korea during the Korean War.	1945 or later	1945 or later	Too early
Gary Wright	Activist; Politician	Jus soli	Canada	A native of Lacey, Washington, Wright became involved with opposition to the Vietnam War in the mid-1960s; his activities with Students for a Democratic Society caused the U.S. State Department to revoke his passport. He emigrated to Canada in 1968, renounced his U.S. citizenship, and became a Canadian citizen in 1974. He would go on to become mayor of New Denver, British Columbia.	1968	1974	Too early
Cynthia Wu	Businesswoman, politician	Jus soli	Republic of China	Wu was born in the United States in 1978, renounced her US citizenship in 2014, and was an executive at the life insurance division of Shin Kong Group in Taiwan. She was Ko Wen-je's vice presidential running mate in the 2024 election and previously served as a legislator in the Legislative Yuan as a member of the Taiwan People's Party from 2022-2024.		2014	Q1 2014
Enoch Wu	Politician, businessman	Jus soli	Republic of China	Wu was born in the United States in 1980, attended elementary and middle school in Taiwan, and stayed in the US for high school, college, and work. He then returned to Taiwan to participate in public service and politics.		2011	Q2 2011
Andrew Yao	Computer scientist	Naturalized	People's Republic of China	Yao was born in Shanghai, China, graduated from National Taiwan University, and immigrated to the United States. He received the Turing Award in 2000 for his work in computer science. He renounced his US citizenship in 2015 and joined the Chinese Academy of Sciences.		2015	Q3 2015
Yang Chen-Ning	Scientist	Naturalized	People's Republic of China	Renounced his U.S. citizenship in late 2015. Yang was a theoretical physicist who won the Nobel Prize in Physics in 1957, and for developing the Yang–Mills theory describing nuclear forces of particle physics.	?	2015	Q3 2015
Nicholas Yang	Businessperson	?	Republic of China; People's Republic of China (Hong Kong)	Yang was born in Taiwan. He graduated from the California Institute of Technology in 1977 and worked for a few years in the U.S. before moving to Hong Kong in 1983. He renounced his U.S. citizenship in May 2012 in preparation for taking up a position as the head of the Hong Kong government's newly created Technology and Communications Bureau.	1983	May 2012	No
Yang Sung-chul	Scholar; Diplomat	Naturalized	South Korea	Yang was born in Gokseong County, Jeollanam-do in 1939. He came to the U.S. in 1965 to study for a master's degree at the University of Hawaii at Manoa's East–West Center. He naturalized as a U.S. citizen in 1977, but returned to South Korea in 1986 and gave up U.S. citizenship to resume his South Korean citizenship in 1989. He went on to become a member of the National Assembly in 1996 and South Korea's ambassador to the U.S. from 2000 to 2003.	1986	1989	Too early
Donnie Yen Chi-tan	Actor	Naturalized	People's Republic of China (Hong Kong)	Yen was born in Taishan, Guangdong in 1963, migrated to Hong Kong with his family at age 2, and then moved to Boston, Massachusetts at age 10, where he spent his teenage years. He returned to Hong Kong in 1983 to pursue a career as a movie actor. He renounced U.S. citizenship in 2009.	1983	2009	Q3 2010
Yoo Gun	Actor	Jus soli	South Korea	Born Jo Jeong-ik in Arizona in 1983 to Korean American parents, he moved to South Korea in the early 1990s, made his debut as a singer there in 1997, and went on to an acting career in the mid-2000s, playing roles in television series such as Prosecutor Princess. He renounced U.S. citizenship in 2011 to serve in the Republic of Korea Army.	1990s	March 2011	No
Jae Yoon	Musician	Naturalized	South Korea	Yoon, a native of South Korea, followed his family to the U.S. when they emigrated there in the 1980s. He returned to South Korea in the 1990s to pursue an entertainment industry career, eventually becoming a member of rock band MC the Max in 1999. He gave up U.S. citizenship in 2009 to serve in the Republic of Korea Army.	1990s	September 2009	No
Erica Yuen	Actor; Politician	?	People's Republic of China (Hong Kong)	Yuen was born in Hong Kong. She renounced U.S. citizenship in 2012 in order to run in the Legislative Council election in September that year.	?	June 2012	Q2 2013
Kateryna Yushchenko	Politician	Jus soli	Ukraine	Born Katherine Clare Chumachenko in Chicago in a Ukrainian immigrant family. The wife of the former President of Ukraine Viktor Yushchenko, she became a Ukrainian citizen in March 2005.	1991	July 2007	No
Kelly Zong	Businessperson; Politician	Naturalized	People's Republic of China	A native of Hangzhou, Zong is the daughter of Hangzhou Wahaha Group founder Zong Qinghou. She attended high school and university in the United States. She naturalized as a U.S. citizen and lived in San Marino, California with her mother Shi Youzhen. However, in 2007 she returned to China and began the procedures to renounce U.S. citizenship and restore her Chinese citizenship.	2007	2007	Q2 2010
Rita Zucca	Other	Jus soli	Italy	Born in New York City, she emigrated to her parents' native Italy in 1938, and renounced her U.S. citizenship in 1941 to save her family's property from expropriation by Mussolini's government. Best known for her role as an "Axis Sally", reading English-language radio broadcasts aimed at U.S. soldiers during World War II.	1938	1941	Too early
Roman Zvarych	Politician	Jus soli	Ukraine	Born in Yonkers, New York to Ukrainian immigrant parents, Zvarych moved to Ukraine in 1991. He co-founded the Congress of Ukrainian Nationalists there in 1992. He renounced his U.S. citizenship in 1995 in order to naturalize as a Ukrainian citizen. He went on to become Minister of Justice under Viktor Yushchenko.	1991	1995	Q2 1997
Péter Zwack	Diplomat	Naturalized	Hungary	Born in Hungary in 1927, Zwack came to the U.S. with his family in 1948. He returned to Hungary in 1988. After the end of Communist rule, he was named Hungarian ambassador to the United States. He renounced his U.S. citizenship in 1990 to take up that post.	1988	1990	Too early
Beverly Zhu	Athlete	Jus soli	People's Republic of China	Born in Westwood, California in 2002, and renounced her U.S. citizenship in 2018 to compete at the Olympics for China, which doesn't allow dual citizenship.	2019	2019	No
Shama Obaed	Politician	Naturalized	Bangladesh	Daughter of Bangladeshi politician KM Obaidur Rahman. She studied at California State University and the University of Phoenix, working in the U.S. financial and tech sectors before returning to Bangladesh. She renounced her U.S. citizenship in November 2025 to run as a candidate in the 2026 general elections. She was later appointed as Minister of State for Foreign Affairs	2007	2025	

== Relinquished and then regained citizenship ==
Name	Occupation	U.S. citizenship	Other citizenships	Description	Year emigrated	Year relinquished	Federal Register
William Fessenden Allen	Businessperson	Jus soli	Kingdom of Hawaii	Allen, a native of Bangor, Maine, accompanied his father to Hawaii in 1850 when the latter was appointed U.S. consul there. He renounced U.S. citizenship to become a subject of the Kingdom of Hawaii in 1860. After the overthrow of the Kingdom of Hawaii, Allen served in the government of the new Republic of Hawaii, promoting the annexation of the country by the United States in 1898. He died in 1906.	1850	1860	Too early
Hope Cooke	Royalty	Jus soli	Sikkim	Cooke, a native of San Francisco, met Crown Prince of Sikkim Palden Thondup Namgyal while in Darjeeling in 1959, and became engaged to him in 1961. She renounced citizenship on March 25, 1963, five days after their wedding, as required by Sikkim's law and to demonstrate to the people of her new home that she was not "an American arm in the Himalayas". After her husband was deposed, she returned to the U.S. with her children and lobbied Congress for the restoration of her citizenship, but a 1976 private bill to this end faced objections from the Senate and had to be watered down to grant her only a green card. By 1981, she had regained U.S. citizenship.	1960s	Mar 25, 1963	Too early
Hiroshi Kashiwagi	Writer	Jus soli	Japan	Kashiwagi was born in Sacramento, California to Japanese immigrant parents. Interned due to his ethnicity along with his family during World War II, he renounced U.S. citizenship under the Renunciation Act of 1944, stating "My position was this — why was I, an American citizen, thrown in prison without cause, without due process? Why were they questioning my loyalty?" He regained citizenship in 1959 through the efforts of civil rights lawyer Wayne M. Collins.	N/A	1944	Too early
Juan Mari Brás	Activist	Jus soli	Puerto Rico	Mari Brás, a native of Puerto Rico and an advocate for its independence, renounced U.S. citizenship in Venezuela in 1994 and received a Certificate of Loss of Nationality; he then returned to Puerto Rico. The Supreme Court of Puerto Rico held in 1997 that he still had the right to vote in elections there. However, in 1998, the State Department reversed its earlier recognition of Mari Brás' renunciation, and stated that he remained a U.S. citizen.	N/A	1994	No
Joel Slater	Activist	Jus soli	None	Waterloo, Iowa native who renounced U.S. citizenship in 1987 in Perth, Australia in protest over the foreign policy of the Ronald Reagan administration, in particular the 1986 bombing of Libya.	N/A	1987	Too early
Elizabeth Taylor	Actress	Jus sanguinis	United Kingdom	Taylor was born in London to American parents in 1932. In October 1965, she signed an oath of renunciation at the U.S. Embassy in Paris, but with the phrase "abjure all allegiance and fidelity to the United States" struck out. State Department officials declared that her renunciation was invalid due to the alteration. Taylor signed another oath without the alteration in October 1966. She applied for U.S. citizenship again in 1977 during then-husband John Warner's Senate campaign.	?	Oct 1966	Too early
