= Ishmael Tetteh Aryeetey =

Ghanaian politician

Hon. Ishmael Tetteh Aryeetey

Member of parliament for Odododiodoo constituency
- In office 7 January 1993 – 7 January 1997
- President: Jerry John Rawlings
- Succeeded by: Nii Okaidja Adamafio

Personal details
- Born: 9 August 1950 (age 76)
- Party: National Democratic Congress
- Education: Dundee University and London School of Economics
- Occupation: Politician
- Profession: Chief Executive

Ishmael Tetteh Aryeetey is a Ghanaian politician and a Chief Executive. He served as a member of parliament in the First Parliament of the Fourth Republic of Ghana for the Odododiodoo constituency in the Greater Accra region of Ghana.

== Early life and education ==
Tetteh Aryeetey was born on 9 August 1950. He attended Dundee University and London School of Economics where he obtained respectively a Bachelor of Science in Mathematics and a Master of Science in Computer Science.

== Politics ==
Tetteh Aryeetey was elected as a member of the First Parliament of the Fourth Republic of Ghana during the 1992 Ghanaian parliamentary election. He contested and won the Odododiodoo seat on the ticket of the National Democratic Congress. He was succeeded by Nii Okaidja Adamafio, who was the Member of Parliament for Odododiodoo constituency in the Second Parliament of the Fourth Republic of Ghana.

== Career ==
During an Inauguration in Accra Ishmael Tetteh Aryeetey as a Former Accra Metropolitan Chief Executive urged students to have much time for mathematics and present to the public ''SoftMaths'' an ICT tool for Mathematics and appealed parents to purchase the app for their children.

During his career, he participated to a survey named ''EXTENDING TAM WITH SOCIAL NORM TO MODEL STUDENTS' INTENTIONS TO ADOPT ICT''

== Personal life ==
He is a Christian.
