= Reginald Nii Bi Ayibonte =

Ghanaian politician

The Honourable Reginald Niibi Ayi-Bonte

Member of the Ghana Parliament for Odododiodoo constituency
- In office January 2001 – December 2004
- Preceded by: Nii Okaija Adamafio
- Succeeded by: Samuel Nii Ayi Mankattah

Personal details
- Born: Accra
- Party: New Patriotic Party

Reginald Niibi Ayi-Bonte is a Ghanaian politician and a former Member of Parliament of the Odododiodoo constituency. He was elected as MP during the 2000 Presidential and Parliamentary elections.

== Politics ==
Ayi-Bonte spent four years in parliament from 2001 to 2004. In 2001, he secured the NPP's nomination to be a parliamentary candidate. In the parliamentary election, he polled 28,270 votes out of the 55,050 valid votes cast representing 51.40% and entered parliament.

In 2004, he was nominated again at party primaries after beating competition from two others. He lost the seat to Samuel Nii Ayi Mankattah during the 2004 Presidential and Parliamentary elections. In 2005, on the death of Mankattah, he sought his party support to contest the bye-election, but was unsuccessful as Asafoatse Sidney Mankattah was selected by the NPP.

In 2007 and 2011, he was again unsuccessful at the party's primaries losing out to Mohammed Adjei Sowah and Victor Okaikoi respectively.

He was appointed the head of the Legal Department of the Accra Metropolitan Assembly. In 2019, he contested in the primaries to be returned as the parliamentary candidate for the New Patriotic Party for the Odododiodioo Constituency. He lost to Nii Lante Bannerman who was retained as the NPP's parliamentary candidate. Ayi-Bonte campaigned for Bannerman during the parliamentary elections held in 2020.

In 2021, he was reported to be considered for the position of Metropolitan Chief Executive of the Accra Metropolitan Assembly.
