= Nii Okaidja Adamafio =

Ghanaian politician

Nii Okaija Adamafio

Member of Parliament for Odododiodoo Constituency
- In office 7 January 1996 – 6 January 2001
- Preceded by: Ishmael Tetteh Aryeetey
- Succeeded by: Reginald Nii Bi Ayibonte

Minister of Interior
- In office 1997–2001
- President: Jerry John Rawlings

Personal details
- Born: Accra
- Party: National Democratic Congress (Ghana)
- Occupation: Lawyer; Politician

Nii Okaidja Adamafio is a Ghanaian politician. He was the Minister of the Interior in the Rawlings government from 1997 to 2001. He was the first Member of Parliament from 1997 to 2001 in the Odododiodoo constituency.

== Early life and education ==
Adamafio is a Ghanaian and was born in Accra, Ghana. He attended Labone Senior High School, and graduated in 1964.

== Politics ==
Adamafio served as Member of Parliament for Odododiodoo constituency in the Greater Accra region of Ghana for two paliamantary sittings. He stood for the position of a Member of Parliament for the Odododiodoo constituency in the year 1992 and won. He again contested and won in the 1996 Ghanaian general elections, on the ticket of the National Democratic Congress with a total valid votes of 29,142 representing 35.40%. This was against his opponents; S.A. Odoi Sykes of the New Patriotic Party who polled 27,097 votes which represented 32.90% of the total valid votes, Samuel Agoe Lantei Lamptey of the People's National Convention who also polled 1, 231 votes representing 1.50% of the total valid votes, Emmanuel Nii Korley Adu Tetteh of the National Convention Party who polled 641 votes which represented 0.80% of the total valid votes and Nii Noi Nortey of the Convention People's Party who polled 528 votes which represented 0.60% of the total valid votes cast. In the 2000 election he secured 24,181 votes (43.9%), losing his seat to Reginald Nii Bi Ayibonte. Adamafio has once served as Minister of Interior under the leadership of His Excellency the Ex-President of Ghana, President Jerry John Rawlings. As a member of the National Democratic Congress (NDC), Adamafio rose to become the vice-chairman of the party. In February 2006 he resigned from the National Democratic Congress. And in 2008 he became the vice-chairman of the Democratic Freedom Party (DFP).
