= Harmon Wilfred =

Harmon Lynn Wilfred is a New Zealand-based businessman. Formerly a U.S. citizen, he emigrated to Canada and then sought asylum in New Zealand after efforts to act as a whistleblower to expose alleged corruption during the resolution of the 1980s and 1990s savings and loan crisis. Wilfred eventually renounced his U.S. citizenship in 2005, becoming stateless as a result.

== Real estate dealings ==
Wilfred's first career was as a real estate developer in the Denver area. He did well during the 1980s real estate boom, but after the advent of the savings and loan crisis his luck took a turn for the worse. By 1990, he had sold all but one of his properties, and the tenant in that property moved out, leaving him with no income to service the $3.2 million loan on the building. Wilfred declared personal bankruptcy, and attempted to work with the Resolution Trust Corporation to sell the building and pay off as much of the loan as possible. However, Wilfred states that the RTC wasted two years ignoring potential deals and then sold the building for $500,000, less than a third of the price Wilfred said he could have obtained for the building. The private company which eventually bought the building, immediately sold it for $1.25 million. In response, Wilfred sued RTC, and made efforts to gain class action status for his suit; he alleged that RTC's wasteful practices had cost taxpayers as much as $30 billion.

Wilfred also provided accounting information which led to a criminal investigation of the El Paso County Retirement Fund in 1994. The District Attorney's office did not find sufficient evidence to merit the filing of charges, but did not comment on whether or not they had discovered financial mismanagement.

== Emigration and renunciation of citizenship ==
Wilfred moved to Canada in the late 1990s, but was removed to the United States in 2000, in what he contends was an illegal extradition. He then moved to New Zealand in 2001 with his Canadian wife Caroline Dare-Wilfred. He went on to renounce U.S. citizenship in 2005, becoming stateless in the process; the U.S. is one of the few countries which allows its citizens abroad to renounce citizenship without having acquired the citizenship of any other country.

Immigration New Zealand reportedly looked into deporting Wilfred, but he applied for New Zealand citizenship, and argued that deporting him to the United States would be inhumane. In 2008, he filed a complaint with the United Nations Human Rights Committee regarding alleged violations of his rights under the International Convention on Civil and Political Rights by Canada and the United States in relation to his 2000 extradition. However, the Committee could not act on his complaint: the United States was not a signatory to that Convention's First Optional Protocol, which recognises the competence of the ICCPR's individual complaint mechanism, and the Committee ruled that Wilfred had not provided sufficient evidence to prove his claims against Canada.

== Activities in New Zealand ==
=== Charitable work ===
In New Zealand, Wilfred became involved in charitable work, providing vocational services for people with disabilities. He was elected chairman of Floyds Creative Arts Charitable Trust, later renamed La Famia Creative Arts; he also set up a number of other charities under the La Famia name. Wilfred and his wife also provided financial backing to the Champion Centre, an organisation for young children with special needs.

Wilfred's charities suffered funding issues as well as disputes with staff. To address funding issues, Wilfred looked into pursuing private business ventures through a charitable trust model, using investment proceeds to fund La Famia's continued operations. As part of this activity, he pressured one of the companies in which he invested, Prenzel Distilling Company, to sell off its award-winning gin and vodka brands. Wilfred stated, "Anytime you're looking at hard liquor and then looking at family values there is going to be a conflict".

Wilfred also use to run a radio show called Radio La Famia.

=== Visa difficulties ===
According to an April 2013 report by The New Zealand Herald, Wilfred's visa to remain in New Zealand expired in 2004, and he has since been out-of-status. David Carter and Christchurch MP Nicky Wagner, both of the New Zealand National Party, were impressed with his charitable work and business investments, and wrote letters of reference for him in support of his visa applications to remain in New Zealand. In November 2011, Associate Immigration Minister Kate Wilkinson appeared as a guest on his show, sparking political controversy because of media allegations that Wilfred had overstayed his visa. News coverage about Wilfred such as this resulted in a complaint to the New Zealand Press Council by Wilfred's friend and business partner Hugh Steadman; however, the Press Council did not agree with Steadman that the coverage amounted to a "campaign of vilification and harassment".

In April 2013, after Wilfred's trading company La Famia No. 2 Ltd was put into liquidation, Winston Peters of New Zealand First called for his deportation, citing allegations that he owed nearly NZ$300,000 to the Inland Revenue Department in unpaid GST and PAYE payments.

Immigration New Zealand served a deportation order on Wilfred in 2011, but was unable to effect deportation due to the lack of a country to which he could be deported. In July 2013, INZ spokesman Dean Blakemore stated that his department had been discussing Wilfred's situation with U.S. authorities with a view to facilitating his removal from New Zealand, but that Wilfred's "position as a stateless individual is an impediment to him being allowed entry into the US".

In August 2013, the New Zealand Office of the Ombudsman began an investigation into the Ministry of Business, Innovation and Employment, the ministry which oversees INZ, regarding its refusal to refer Wilfred's application for New Zealand citizenship to the Ministry of Internal Affairs. Two immigration lawyers expressed consternation at the Ombudsman's investigation, and suggested that INZ's inability to deport people who become stateless after renouncing foreign citizenships or to block their applications for New Zealand citizenship was a "loophole" presenting problems for enforcement actions against people lacking legal immigration status. In response to the news, immigration compliance officer Natalie Gardiner stated that INZ's position was that Wilfred "should leave the country as soon as possible." By March 2014, Gardiner stated that INZ remained unable to reach an agreement for the United States Embassy to issue a travel document to Wilfred, so he could be deported to the United States, despite the request of INZ Minister Michael Woodhouse that the U.S. government reconsider its position on the issue. His wife Caroline flew to Canada in September 2015 and subsequently had her New Zealand visa waiver revoked, effectively denying her re-entry to the country. Her application for a New Zealand investor visa was also turned down. In 2018, due to ongoing U.S. refusal to cooperate in Wilfred's deportation, Immigration New Zealand withdrew the deportation order against him, but his wife remained unable to return to New Zealand.

== Personal life ==
Wilfred has been married three times, most recently to Caroline Dare-Wilfred of Canada, whose family runs the Dare Foods Group of Ontario. Dare-Wilfred's marriage to him created tensions with her relatives, which eventually led her to attempt to sell her 27% stake in the Dare Foods Group. He has three children in the U.S. from his previous two marriages.
