= Tom Bayer =

Vanuatuan banker

Thomas Montgomery Bayer is a Vanuatuan banker. A former U.S. citizen, he pursued a career in the finance sector. He lived in Australia and Singapore before moving to Vanuatu (then the New Hebrides) in 1974, where he became a citizen after independence and has continued to reside there. He was previously executive chairman of European Bank and managing director of the Pacific International Trust Company, he is now a member of the board of directors of the Reserve Bank of Vanuatu.

== Early life and career ==
A native of Pennsylvania, Bayer graduated from Lehigh University before going on to the Wharton School of Business.

He served in the United States Army attaining the rank of captain. After leaving the U.S. military, Bayer worked in international banking. He moved to Australia in 1967 and later to Singapore. He moved from Singapore to the New Hebrides in 1974 to become the vice-managing director of the Pacific International Trust Company, and was promoted to managing director the following year.

His relocation came just as the groundwork was being laid for the islands' independence from the United Kingdom and France; when Vanuatu became independent in 1980 and asked prominent members of society to take Vanuatu citizenship, Bayer chose to accept in 1982, giving up U.S. citizenship in the process.

== European Bank ==
Bayer became the executive chairman of European Bank in 1986. The bank began expanding its business in the mid-1990s. European Bank faced investigations by foreign regulatory authorities in July 1999 when one of its account-holders deposited US$7.5 million in funds, which U.S. officials believed to be the proceeds of a credit card fraud. This was part of a larger wave of concern about financial institutions in the South Pacific, which several U.S. banks, including the Bank of New York and JP Morgan Chase, to suspend dollar transactions not just with Vanuatu but Nauru and Palau and eventually Niue as well. Bayer was critical of this response, noting that Vanuatu had criminalised money laundering as early as 1989, and voiced his suspicions that both the U.S. government and U.S. banks were insincere in their desire to crack down on money laundering but rather had turned their attention to Vanuatu because it was a small and distant target, and one of the few offshore financial centres which was not a dependency of major foreign powers.

Vanuatu pursued a diplomatic approach to resolving the situation, in which Bayer played a large role: a Vanuatu delegation headed by Bayer went to the U.S. and met with International Monetary Fund, U.S. State Department, and Federal Reserve System officials in January 2000 to discuss details of Vanuatu's anti-money laundering laws and practices, and arranged for reciprocal visits by State Department and Financial Action Task Force officials to Port Vila in the following months. This successfully persuaded some banks to resume transactions with Vanuatu, but other correspondent banks in the U.S. continued to apply sanctions. In May 2002, the U.S. indicted Bayer and two colleagues on charges including laundering the proceeds of another business through European Bank, and again froze the bank's U.S. funds. In March 2012, after nearly a decade of litigation, European Bank successfully unfroze its accounts and had its funds returned, with interest.

== Reserve Bank of Vanuatu ==
Bayer retired from his position as PITCO chairman in November 2011. In June 2012, then-Minister of Finance Moana Carcasses appointed Bayer to the board of the Reserve Bank of Vanuatu. Opposition politicians including Serge Vohor of the Union of Moderate Parties, Jeff Patunvanu of Nagriamel, and members of the Vanua'aku Pati questioned the move due to Bayer's previous association with European Bank.

In March 2013, new Minister of Finance Charlot Salwai, who succeeded to the position after Carcasses lost his seat in the October 2012 elections, attempted to remove Bayer from the RBV board, claiming that he was an agent of European Bank and was thus disqualified from serving under the Reserve Bank of Vanuatu Act Section 8(10)(b). Bayer described the dismissal as illegal and Salawai's claim as misleading and defamatory as he had not been a board member of European Bank for more than a decade, and suggested that the move was tied to party politics. The following month, after the collapse of the Sato Kilman government in whose cabinet Salawai served, and the election of Carcasses (who had since crossed the floor) as prime minister, RBV Governor Odo Tevi himself was removed after more than ten years in his position. Members of Parliament expressed differing opinions on the issue: Robert Bohn Sikol stated that "Tevi had done a good job and was not sacked", whereas Leader of the Opposition Ham Lini described it as retaliation for Bayer's removal. In August 2013, Bayer was again appointed to the RBV board by new Minister of Finance Maki Simelum.
