= Ghana Rowing and Canoeing Association =

National sports governing body

- Sport: Rowing
- Founded: 1990
- Affiliation: International Rowing Federation
- (Ghana)

Ghana Rowing and Canoeing Association is the umbrella body that governs and promotes rowing and canoeing in Ghana. The association is headquartered in Accra. The association promotes the sport of canoeing by organizing courses and competitions for interest participants. Through such competitions, the association is able to select winners to participate in international tournaments.

== Executive board ==
The association has the following executives:

- President - Francis Decland

Vice President - Kamal Sulley

- Immediate past president - Hon. Jonathan Nii Tackie Kommey (M.P)
- Secretary General - Saka Acquaye

== Competitions ==
The association has sent competing teams to major competitions including:

- 2009 All African Games held in Ivory Coast.
- 2009 West African Canoe Kayak Championship

== Donations ==
The Association received a fleet of boats from FISA to aid in the development of rowing and canoeing in the country.
