= Victor Okaikoi =

Ghanaian politician (b. 1950)

Victor Nii Kutey Okaikoi (born 1950) is a Ghanaian former army captain and New Patriotic Party politician. He was a candidate for the Odododiodoo constituency of the Accra Metropolis District in the 2012 Ghanaian parliamentary election.

== Military career ==
Okaikoi first came to public attention as a member of the Pre-Trial Investigative Team (PIT), the main investigative organ of the Jerry Rawlings-led Armed Forces Revolutionary Council (AFRC) in 1979. This investigative organ allegedly carried out acts of torture against former military, government officials and business owners as part of the AFRC's "housecleaning" exercise. None of these allegations were investigated. Colonel Kofi Abaka Jackson, a witness who appeared before Ghana's National Reconciliation Commission in 2003, testified that when he appeared before the PIT "Captain Okaikoi mounted the table and used a needle to punch holes in his chest, but he did not bleed. Okaikoi then asked him why he was not bleeding and followed it up with more slaps. He then brought out a pistol, and used it to hammer his skull." Colonel Jackson's allegations were neither substantiated nor proven. Capt. Okaikoi was removed from his AFRC functions when he was accused, together with some of his colleagues, of taking undue advantage of the PIT to benefit financially from PIT suspects. Although the A.F.R.C's claims were dismissed by its own dreaded People's Court, the accused were convicted and sentenced to terms of imprisonment. On 12 November 1979 Okaikoi and his co-accused escaped from the Ussher Fort Prison in Accra, and managed to flee to the United Kingdom where they were granted political asylum. Capt. Okaikoi attended Achimota School, and is a graduate from the Military Academy and Training School, where he won the 'Academic Cane' of his graduating class, Intake XII. He also holds a B.A (Hons) Government from Essex University, U.K, 1984 and Diploma Law from London's City University, U.K.

== Early political campaign ==
Because of Okaikoi's political background, some protested against his candidature on the NPP ticket, notable among them being Samuel Odoi-Sykes and Nyaho Nyaho-Tamakloe, two of the NPP's founding members. Nevertheless, he emerged victorious in the NPP primaries for Odododiodoo in April 2011; the two defeated NPP candidates Shiehk Ahmed Nii Annan Tackie and former Odododiodoo MP Reginald Nii Bi Ayibonte threw their support behind him and offered their resources to him to aid his campaign. In July 2011, as his campaign was still in its early days, Okaikoi was taken to court by a Ghanaian living in the United Kingdom over a GH¢15,000 property deal gone bad. Okaikoi had offered to sell his plot of land at Kwashiman to the complainant, but the complainant alleged that Okaikoi had taken his money and then sold the land to another person. At trial it came out that the deal had been cancelled by Capt. Okaikoi and the buyer's deposit refunded to him because he had failed to keep the agreed schedule of payments for the balance: the judge found for the accused. Capt. Okaikoi ran on a platform of the improvement of the quality of life for his constituents. Among his campaign promises, he stated that he would work for the rebuilding and expansion of the Makola, Kantamanto and Salaga markets, the biggest markets in the country, and the reduction of taxes on people doing business in the markets. He noted that the constituency which included the only designated business district in the capital city, was home to the biggest financial institutions, including the Central Bank of Ghana and the country's highest Courts needed to be represented effectively in order to fully benefit from central administration.

== Election ==
In preparation for Nomination Day, Okaikoi relinquished U.S. citizenship in August 2012. Okaikoi faced off against Edwin Nii Lante Vanderpuye of the ruling National Democratic Congress; in November 2012, Vanderpuye claimed that if he got less than 65% of the vote, he would concede the seat to Okaikoi. In the end, Vanderpuye won by a smaller landslide than expected, with 45,967 votes (63%) against 26,269 (36%) for Okaikoi and 745 (1%) for Emmanuel Odoi of the Convention People's Party.
