= Samuel Nii Ayi Mankattah =

Ghanaian politician

Hon. Samuel Nii Ayi Mankattah

Member of the Ghana Parliament for Odododiodio
- In office 7 January 2001 – 6 January 2005
- Preceded by: Reginald Nii Bi Ayibonte
- Succeeded by: Jonathan Nii Tackie Kommey

Member of Parliament for Odododiodio Constituency
- In office 7 January 2005 – 5 July 2005

Personal details
- Born: Accra
- Died: 5 July 2005
- Party: National Democratic Congress

Samuel Nii Ayi Mankattah was a Ghanaian politician and Member of Parliament for the Odododiodio constituency. He was first elected MP during the 2004 Presidential and Parliamentary election after the NDC Parliamentary candidate, Nii Lante Vanderpuije stepped down after a controversy about election registration. The constituency seat became vacant after his death in 2005.

== Political career ==
Mankattah spent about six months in parliament from Jan to July, 2005.

In 2004, he defeated the incumbent New Patriotic Party MP, Reginald Nii Bi Ayibonte.

== Elections ==
In 2004, he contested for the Odododiodio parliamentary seat once more. He won on the ticket of the National Democratic Congress. His constituency was a part of the 11 parliamentary seats out of 27 seats won by the National Democratic Congress in that election for the Greater Accra Region. The National Democratic Congress won a minority total of 94 parliamentary seats out of 230 seats. He was elected with 35, 634 votes out of 67,994 total valid votes cast. This was equivalent to 52.4% of total valid votes cast. He was elected over Reginald Nii Bi Ayi-Bonte of the New Patriotic Party and Isaac Nii Annan M Offei of the Convention People's Party. These obtained 31,546 and 814 votes respectively of total valid votes cast. These were equivalent to 46.4% and 1.2% respectively of total valid votes cast. His term in office came to an end shortly after he won the election when he died on 5 July 2005.

== Personal life ==
Mankattah was a Christian.

== Death ==
Mankattah died on 5 July 2005.
