= Edwin Nii Lante Vanderpuye =

Ghanaian sports journalist and politician

Hon. Edwin Nii Lantey Vanderpuye MP
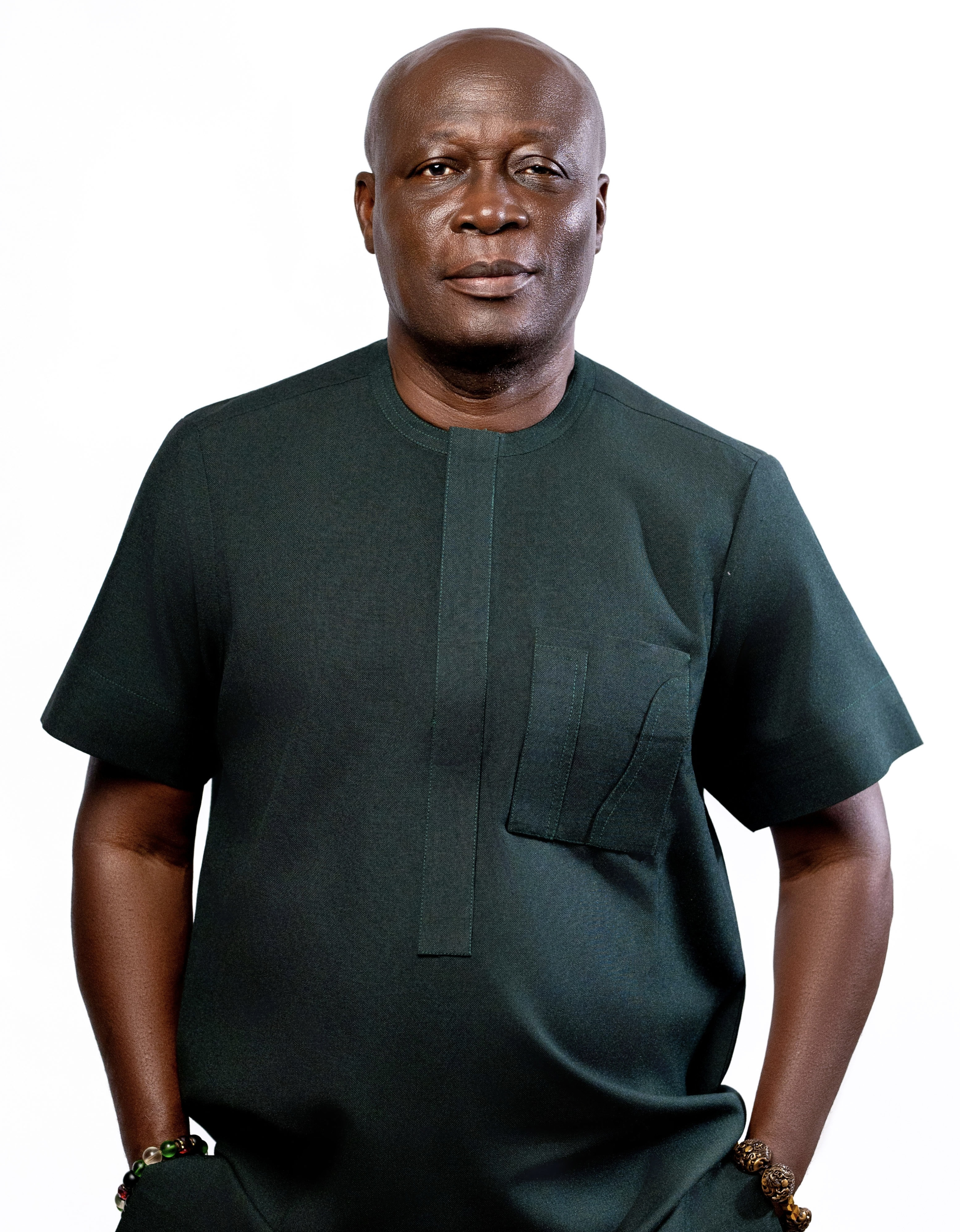

Member of the Ghana Parliament for Odododiodio
- In office 7 January 2013 – 5 January 2025
- Preceded by: Jonathan Nii Tackie Kommey
- Succeeded by: Alfred Nii Kotey Ashie

Minister of Youth and Sports
- In office 2015–2017
- Preceded by: Mustapha Ahmed
- Succeeded by: Isaac Kwame Asiamah

Deputy Minister for Local Government and Rural Development
- In office 2014–2015

Personal details
- Born: 11 June 1965 (age 61) Accra
- Party: National Democratic Congress
- Education: University of Ghana; Ghana Institute of Management and Public Administration
- Occupation: Sports Journalist, politician

Edwin Nii Lantey Vanderpuye (born 11 June 1965) is a Ghanaian sports journalist and politician and a former Member of Parliament for the Odododiodio constituency. He served as Minister of Youth and Sports and as Deputy Minister of Trade and Industry in the John Dramani Mahama's government.

== Education ==
He is an alumnus of Bechem Presbyterian Boys' Secondary School and Mfantsipim School, Cape Coast. He holds a master's degree in Governance & Leadership from the Ghana Institute of Management and Public Administration (GIMPA) and a B.A. in English, philosophy and classics from the University of Ghana.

== Career ==
From 1990 to 2004, he worked at the Ghana Broadcasting Corporation, where he became the Deputy Head of Sports. Between 2005 and 2008, he was the Head of Sports at Network Broadcasting Limited.

== Personal life ==
Edwin Nii Lantey Vanderpuye is a Christian.

== Political career ==
He was a special aide and director of operations at the presidency under former President of Ghana President Mills and also the former Deputy Minister for Trade and Industry under John Mahama.

=== Member of Parliament ===
He was elected as MP during the 2012 elections, where he faced off against Victor Okaikoi of the New Patriotic Party. Vanderpuye was quite confident about his chances of winning, famously stating in November 2012 that if he got less than 65% of the vote, he would concede the seat to Okaikoi. In the end, Vanderpuye won by a smaller landslide than expected, with 45,967 votes (63%) against 26,269 (36%) for Okaikoi and 745 (1%) for Emmanuel Odoi of the Convention People's Party.

In December 2016, he was retained as the member of Parliament for the Odododiodio Constituency with 36,606 votes, representing 57.04% against his closest contender, the New Patriotic Party, whose candidate had 26,671 votes, representing 41.56%. He served in Parliament as the ranking member on the Local Government and Rural Development Committee and as a member on the Privileges committee and Appointments committee.

He won the 2020 elections with 53.83% of votes over his closest opponent, Nii Lante Bannerman of the NPP, who got 45.31%.

As the 2024 elections approached, Edwin Nii Lantey Vanderpuye chose not to seek re-election to Parliament. He cited frustrations faced by lawmakers in carrying out their duties, particularly the high attrition rates in the House. These frequent turnovers hinder members from gaining the experience needed to effectively advance parliamentary work.

=== Deputy Minister to Minister of Youth and Sports ===
In March 2013, he was appointed as Deputy Minister for Trade and Industry under the John Mahama government. He served in that role until 2014, when he was moved to serve as Deputy Minister for Local Government and Rural Development, where he served until 2015. After a ministerial reshuffle in 2015, Vanderpuye was named by John Dramani Mahama as Minister of Youth and Sports to replace Dr. Mustapha Ahmed.
