= Chris Nam =

South Korean businessman (1954–2021)

- Born: 10 June 1954; Uiseong, North Gyeongsang Province, South Korea
- Died: 20 March 2021 (aged 66)
- Education: Konkuk University (B.A., M.A.)
- Known for: Founder of New Star Realty

Korean name
- Hangul: 남문기
- Hanja: 南文基
- RR: Nam Mungi
- MR: Nam Mun'gi
- Website: nammoonkey.com

Chris Moonkey Nam (10 June 1954 – 20 March 2021) was a South Korean businessman and past Korean American community leader. A former citizen of the United States by naturalisation, he renounced U.S. citizenship in 2011 in order to pursue his political ambitions in his country of birth.

== Early life and career ==
Nam was born in Uiseong, North Gyeongsang Province, South Korea. He earned bachelor's and master's degrees in public administration from Konkuk University, and also spent two years working for Korea Housing & Commercial Bank (now part of KB Kookmin Bank). He moved to the United States in 1982, settling in Southern California. There, he founded New Star Realty in 1988; New Star would grow to become the largest real estate agency catering to the Korean American community. He also served as head of the Korean-American Federation of Los Angeles and the Korean-American Chamber of Commerce.

== Federation of Korean Associations, USA ==
In May 2009, Nam was elected as the 23rd president of the Federation of Korean Associations, USA. Among other activities as president, he spoke out in favour of efforts to raise voter turnout among South Koreans in the United States, noting that while there might be as many as 900,000 potential voters in the Los Angeles metropolitan area alone, there was only one polling place, which could take as much as two hours' travel for some voters to reach.

== Grand National Party ==
In July 2011, Nam was chosen by Hong Jun-pyo of the Grand National Party (now the Saenuri Party) as the head of the party's Overseas Korean Committee (재외국민위원). This position required him to be a South Korean citizen and not hold any foreign citizenships; however, he was unable to give up his U.S. citizenship by the deadline a month after he had been named to the position, and so his nomination was cancelled. His appointment with the U.S. embassy in Seoul to renounce citizenship was held in September. His renunciation was confirmed by a notice in the Federal Register in July 2012.

== Honours and awards ==
In August 2009, Nam was invited to speak at the graduation ceremony of his alma mater Konkuk University, and on the occasion was awarded an honorary doctorate in politics.
