= Jonathan Nii Tackie Kommey =

Hon. Jonathan Nii Tackie-Komme

Member of the Ghana Parliament for Odododiodoo constituency
- In office 2005 – Dec 2008
- Preceded by: Samuel Nii Ayi Mankattah
- Succeeded by: Edwin Nii Lante Vanderpuye
- In office Jan 2009 – Jan 2013
- President: John Atta Mills

Personal details
- Born: 23 May 1953 (age 73) Accra
- Party: National Democratic Congress (Ghana)
- Education: Ghana Institute of Management and Public Administration

Jonathan Nii Tackie-Komme is a Ghanaian teacher, public servant and a politician. He is the immediate past Member of Parliament of the Odododiodoo constituency. He was elected as MP through a by-election held on 30 August 2005. The by-election became necessary after the death of Samuel Nii Ayi Mankattah, the incumbent MP. He won the election on the ticket of the National Democratic Congress (NDC) in 2005 by defeating five other candidates.

== Early life and education ==
Hon. Tackie-Komme was born a royal and he comes from the Ga dynasty. His father was a former King (paramount chief) of the Ga people in Accra. He attended the Accra Sempe School and later the Kinbu Senior Technical School (formerly Government Boys School) where he graduated with a Middle School Leaving certificate. He entered into public service right after. Between 1970 and 1974 he was a school tutor. He joined the Greater Accra Regional House of Chiefs as a public servant between 1974 and 1985 and quickly rose to the rank of Assistant Registrar. From 2003 to 2005, he was an Assembly Member at the Accra Metropolitan Assembly for the Kinka Electoral Area, and from 2005 to 2012, he was elected as the Member of Parliament for the Odododiodioo Constituency. Professionally, Hon Tackie-Komme is a member of the Institute of Directors-Ghana where he obtained a certificate and diploma in Corporate Governance. He also possesses an Executive Masters in Governance and Leadership (EMGL) from the Ghana Institute of Management and Public Administration.

== Years in Parliament ==
Hon. Tackie-Komme spent seven years in parliament from 2005 to 2012 where he contributed to democracy and the rule of law in Ghana. He was the vice-chairman of the Parliamentary Committee on Government Assurance, and a member of four others: Committee on Trade, Industry and Tourism; Committee on Roads & Transport; Committee on Subsidiary & Legislation; and the Committee on Members Holding Office of Profit. As a lawmaker, he represented Ghana at international events. In July, 2012, he took part in a parliamentary committee on Government Assurance exchange program with the Ugandan Parliament in Uganda. Between August and September, 2010, he formed part of a parliamentary study tour on Roads and Transport Management in the United Kingdom, the Netherlands and Germany. In October, 2009, he participated in a parliamentary study tour on Tariff Advisory Board in Washington, D.C., the United States. That same year in April, he took part in a multi-sectorial workshop on control of injury organized by the Kwame Nkrumah University of Science and Technology, the University of Washington (Seattle, USA) and the Harborview Injury Prevention & Research Center. Aside his parliamentary duties, he brought a lot of educational, health, commercial, social, ICT and infrastructural development to his people. The Ussher Polyclinic, just like the other clinics that serve the constituency received infrastructural boost with the expansion of the female ward and distribution of state of the arts equipment: wheel chairs, hospital beds, drip stands, generator and poly tanks among others. The nurses' resting room also saw full refurbishment. Both basic and secondary schools in the area had their fair share of books, sporting kits, learning desks and computer laboratory installations. The Motor Transport and Traffic Unit (MTTU) of the James Town Police office was also renovated. Non-Governmental Organizations, formal organizations and social clubs were supported towards the realization of communal goals. The developments were championed using his share of the District Assemblies Common Fund, the Ghana Education Trust Fund(GETFund) and the Heavily Indebted Poor Countries (HIPC) fund. He lost his bid to represent the constituency during the 2012 NDC primaries to Edwin Nii Lante Vanderpuye.

== Ghana Civil Aviation Authority ==
In 2009, HE John Atta Mills (former president of Ghana) appointed Hon. Tackie-Komme to the Board of the Ghana Civil Aviation Authority where he served until early 2014 when the board was dissolved. He constituted a delegation to international assignments at the International Civil Aviation Organization headquarters in Montreal, Quebec, Canada. In November, 2010, he led a delegation to the World Travel Market staged in London, the United Kingdom.

== Ghana Rowing and Canoeing Association ==
Hon Tackie-Komme has a strong passion for sports. He is the immediate past president of the Ghana Rowing and Canoeing Association. He helped in the promotion of canoeing in Ghana. During this time, Ghana took part in her first ever international canoeing competition: the West African Canoe Kayak Championship which was held in Côte d'Ivoire in October, 2009. His leadership also saw the National Sports Council (NSC) in Accra receiving 26 Canoes and 30 paddles as donation from the International Canoe Federation (ICF), headquartered in Switzerland, to promote and develop the sport in the country. He was part of the Government of Ghana's delegation to the 2012 Summer Olympics in London.

== Boards and Institutions ==
1. Board Member, Accra Traffic Management (Accra Metropolitan Assembly), (2012 to date).

2. Board Member, Ghana Civil Aviation Authority, (2009 to 2014)

3. Chairman, Rowing and Canoeing Association of the National Sports Authority, (2008 to 2014)

4. Board Member, Ga-Mashie Development Agency, (2000 to date)

5. Chairman, Board of Governors (Holy Trinity Snr. High Sch.), (2003 to 2005)
