= Barbara Stcherbatcheff =

American author and journalist (born 1981)

Barbara Murphy (born 1981 in Chicago, Illinois, US) is a British-American best-selling author, successful communications professional, and copywriter who has worked for Swiss Re, Sika, Robeco, and other large multinational companies and media agencies.

After launching a banking career in the City of London, she started writing the weekly City Girl column in the Thelondonpaper. She regularly contributes to Newsweek and other publications.

== Bibliography ==
She has discussed her book, "Confessions of a City Girl" (Random House, 2009) on numerous television and radio channels, including BBC Business, Six O'Clock News, ITV, and Ten O'Clock News, Sky News, the BBC News Channel, BBC1's The Big Questions with Nicky Campbell, BBC Radio, BBC Radio Five Live, LBC radio, the BBC World Service, Bloomberg and Al Jazeera English. Her book has been translated into German and Polish.
