= Odododiodio =

Ghana parliament constituency

- constituency for the Parliament of Ghana
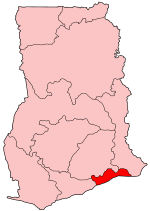
- District: Accra Metropolis District
- Region: Greater Accra Region of Ghana

Current constituency
- Party: National Democratic Congress
- MP: Alfred Nii Kotey Ashie

Odododiodio is one of the constituencies represented in the Parliament of Ghana. It elects one Member of Parliament (MP) by the first past the post system of election.

At the by-election held on the 30 August 2005, Jonathan Nii Tackie Komey (NDC) won with a majority of 8,377 to replace Samuel Nii Ayi Mankattah also of the NDC who had died earlier.

== Boundaries ==
The seat is located entirely within the Accra Metropolitan Area in turn within the Greater Accra Region of Ghana. Mainly cosmopolitan constituency, Odododiodio’s diversity makes it a hotbed for politics. it is in the heart of Accra. It has been in existence since 1992 and covers communities in Ga Mashie, Ministries, Makola, Jamestown, Usher town and Kantamanto. It shares boundaries with Klottey Korley, Ablekuma South and Dadetokopon.

== Electoral Map of Constituency ==
The Constituency consists of Seven Electoral Areas. These Electoral Areas are

1. Korle Dudor
2. Amanmomo
3. Mudor
4. Ngleshie
5. Kinka
6. Korle Wonko
7. Nmlista Gonnor
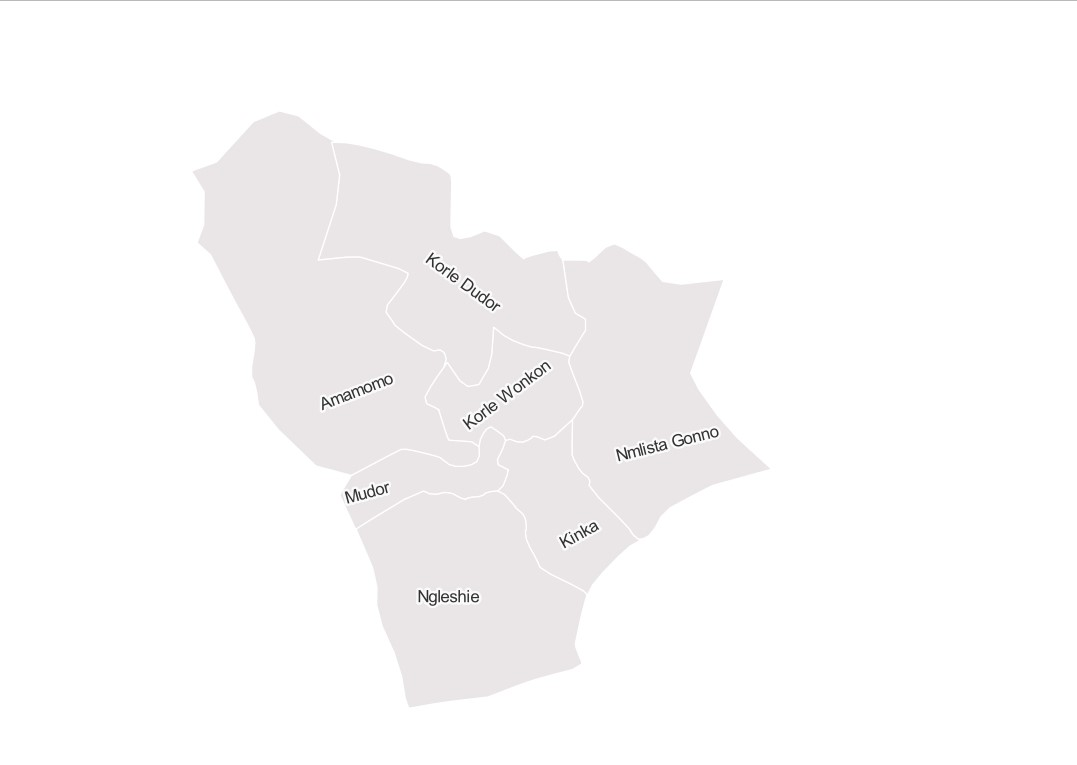

== Members of Parliament ==
Election	Member	Party
1992	Nii Okaidja Adamafio	National Democratic Congress
2000	Reginald Nii Bi Ayibonte	New Patriotic Party
2004	Samuel Nii Ayikwei Mankattah	National Democratic Congress
2005	Jonathan Nii Tackie Kommey	National Democratic Congress
2012	Edwin Nii Lante Vanderpuye	National Democratic Congress
2016	Edwin Nii Lante Vanderpuye	National Democratic Congress
2020	Edwin Nii Lante Vanderpuye	National Democratic Congress
2024	Alfred Nii Kotey Ashie	National Democratic Congress

== Elections ==
2008 Ghanaian parliamentary election: Odododiodio Source:Ghana Home Page
Party	Candidate	Votes	%	±%
National Democratic Congress	Jonathan Nii Tackie Kommey	34,812	56.1	−1.8
New Patriotic Party	Mohammed Adjei Sowah	25,495	41.1	1.3
Convention People's Party	Emmanuel Oddoye Jnr.	703	1.1	−1.0
People's National Convention	Isaac Adjevor	595	1.0	—
Democratic Freedom Party	Edward Nii Darko Dodoo	309	0.5	—
Democratic People's Party	Ali Umar Kuriba	113	0.2	0.0
Majority		9,317	15.0	—
Turnout				—

Odododiodio by-election, 2005 Source:Ghana Home Page
Party	Candidate	Votes	%	±%
National Democratic Congress	Jonathan Nii Tackie Komey	26,841	57.9	+5.5
New Patriotic Party	Asafoatse Sidney Mankattah	18,464	39.8	−6.6
Convention People's Party	Christian Shanco-Bruce	946	2.1	—
Democratic People's Party	Nii Issaka Collison-Cofie	98	0.2	—
Majority		8,377	18.1	+12.1
Turnout		46,991	57.6	−25.7

2004 Ghanaian parliamentary election: Odododiodio Sources:Electoral Commission of Ghana / Ghana Home Page
Party	Candidate	Votes	%	±%
National Democratic Congress	Samuel Nii Ayikwei Mankattah	35,634	52.4	+8.5
New Patriotic Party	Reginald Nii Bi Ayibonte	31,546	46.4	−4.9
Independent	Isaac Nii Annan Mettle-Ofei	814	1.2	—
Majority		4,088	6.0	−1.4
Turnout		67,994	83.3	—

2000 Ghanaian parliamentary election: Odododiodio Source:Adam Carr's Election Archives
Party	Candidate	Votes	%	±%
New Patriotic Party	Reginald Nii Bi Ayibonte	28,270	51.3	—
National Democratic Congress	Nii Okaija Adamafio	24,181	43.9	—
National Reform Party	Francisca Lamptey	1,289	2.3	—
People's National Convention	Baba Imoro	678	1.2	—
Convention People's Party	David Kwarteboi Quartey	461	0.8	—
United Ghana Movement	Nii-Armah Tagoe	171	0.3	—
Majority		4,089	7.4	—

1996 Ghanaian parliamentary election: Odododiodio Source:Google Archives of Ghana Review International
Party	Candidate	Votes	%	±%
National Democratic Congress	Nii Okaija Adamafio	—	—	—

1992 Ghanaian parliamentary election: Odododiodio Source:
Party	Candidate	Votes	%	±%
National Democratic Congress	Nii Okaija Adamafio	—	—	—

== See also ==
- List of Ghana Parliament constituencies
- Parliamentary constituencies in the Greater Accra Region
