= Denationalized citizenship =

Citizenship process

Denationalized citizenship is a concept which redefines traditional notions of citizenship as intrinsically linked with the nation-state and occurs within a subnational scale. A denationalized citizen does not consider the nation-state as being necessary for political participation and identity.

== Overview ==
The concept of citizenship has historically been associated with national identity and the nation-state since the French Revolution saw the people claim sovereignty of the state and essentially become the state. The growing importance of global processes has led to practices which were previously uniquely bound with the nation-state moving to other private, supranational and subnational institutions and spheres. Denationalized citizenship is a concept which has emerged due to complex processes associated with globalization and the consequent changes of the role of the nation-state due to privatization, deregulation and increased human rights. These globalization processes occurring most notably since the 1980s have created new and strengthened pre-existing divisions within nation-states. Put simply, denationalized citizenship is when communities have a stronger sense of belonging and identification with smaller cultural and social groups than with their nation-state. For example, some see the United States as a nation of nationalities more than a nation-state. Denationalized citizenship suggests that citizenship can be practiced at a variety of scales and leads to a new understanding of the relationship between citizenship and the nation-state. Denationalized citizenship is not, however, entirely disconnected from the nation-state but indicates a new way of interacting with it and within it.

== Social aspects ==
Denationalized citizenship and an increase in self-determination can create new political spaces and arenas of participation. Denationalized citizenship may empower groups such as women who could establish a public presence and make claims on the state. Therefore denationalized citizenship exists partly due to the actions of the excluded. Increased civil rights facilitate the denationalization of citizenship as citizens can make claims against their nation-states and act autonomously in the political sphere. Denationalized citizenship reflects the evolving and progressing capacity of democracy and the democratization of citizenship is therefore linked to denationalization and the changing authority of nation-states. Another type of right which denationalizes citizenship is the portable rights within the European Union, for example, where there is a change in recognition from citizens of a nation-state to individuals as individuals. Denationalized citizenship calls for a new understanding of citizenship as a concept which encompasses many, at times overlapping, communities and feelings of belonging and identification.

== Debates ==
Denationalized citizenship emerges from the premise that nation-states are no longer solely capable of enhancing political participation and can in fact create an obstacle for such activity. Additionally, identity is no longer synonymous with the nation-state and citizenship is increasingly understood as "a form of identification, a type of political identity, something to be constructed, not empirically given" (Mouffe, 1992: 231). These points appear to challenge the sovereignty and authority of the nation-state as the traditional frame of reference for identity and political participation which imply a pressure to fragment territorial structures.

=== Criticisms ===
The idea that denationalized citizenship poses a serious problem for the nation-state is contested. Practices of national citizenship may be in decline due to the many processes transforming citizenship however some believe that these challenges do not completely undermine the state but rather signify a simultaneous reconfiguring of citizenship and the nation-state's functions. Denationalized citizenship can coexist with the nation-state but is necessary to widen the possibilities of political participation in the globalizing world.

== Denationalized citizenship vs. Postnational and Transnational citizenship ==
Denationalized citizenship, postnational and transnational citizenship are frequently misused and used interchangeably, therefore a distinction between the terms is important. Denationalized citizenship is often used to mean any type of contemporary concept of citizenship which separates itself from the nation-state, however it alone means processes occurring within the borders of the nation-state. Postnational and transnational citizenship refer to new types of citizenship, such as citizenship of the European Union, which are outside of national borders and, although all concepts share some characteristics, denationalized citizenship does not require that citizenship be relocated to outside of the nation-state, as is central to postnational and transnational citizenship. Although denationalized citizenship can be associated with or caused by global and transnational processes, it occurs within the national and not outside of or across several nation-states.
