= History of citizenship =

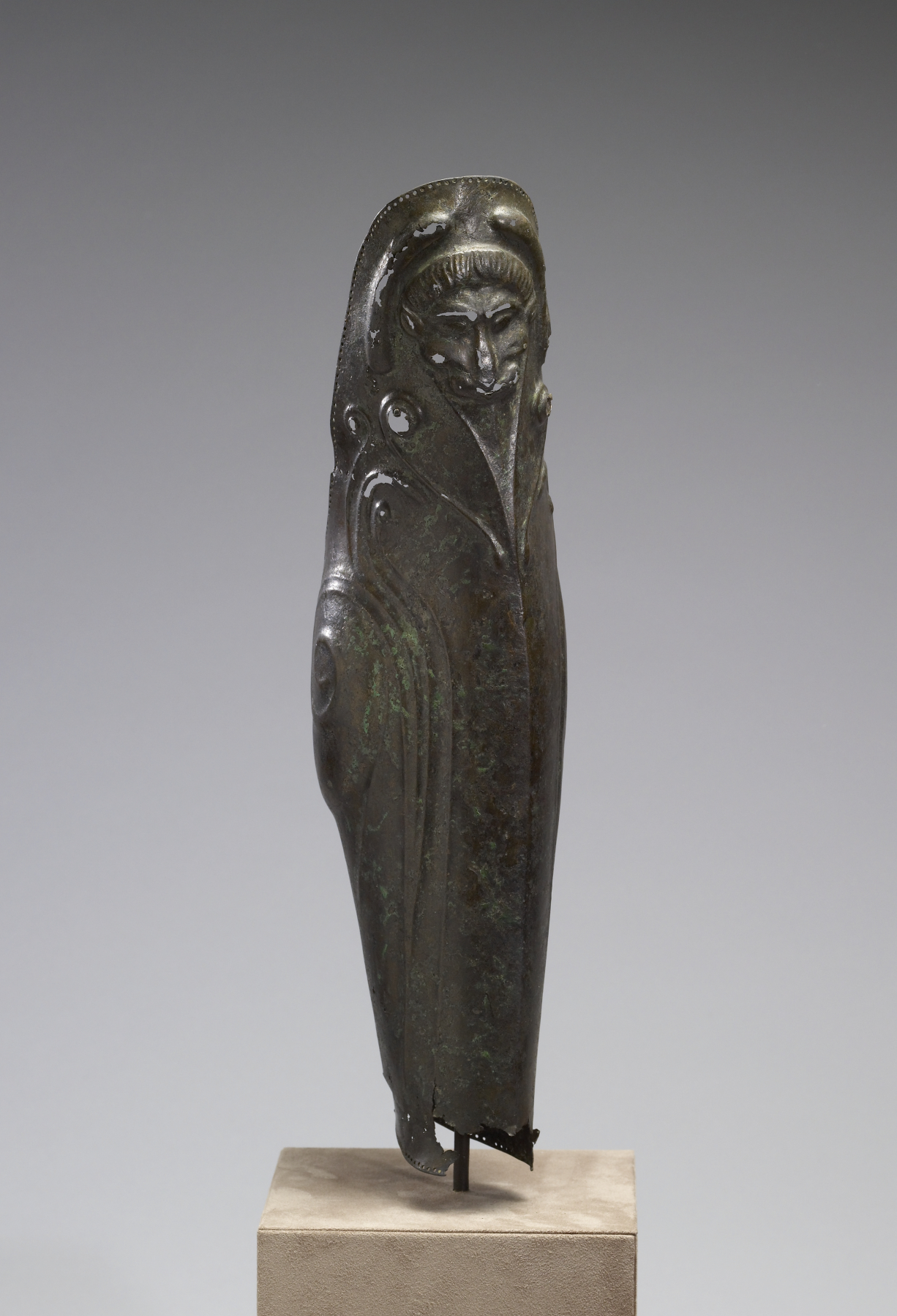
Ancient Athenian armor from the 6th century BCE called a greave covered a citizen-soldier's knee and lower leg. A hoplite's armor signified its owner's social status as well as his service to the community. (Snodgrass 1967 (1999), 58–59)

History of citizenship describes the changing relation between an individual and the state, known as citizenship. Citizenship is generally identified not as an aspect of Eastern civilization but of Western civilization. There is a general view that citizenship in ancient times was a simpler relation than modern forms of citizenship, although this view has been challenged.

While there is disagreement about when the relation of citizenship began, many thinkers point to the early city-states of ancient Greece, possibly as a reaction to the fear of slavery, although others see it as primarily a modern phenomenon dating back only a few hundred years. In Roman times, citizenship began to take on more of the character of a relationship based on law, with less political participation than in ancient Greece but a widening sphere of who was considered to be a citizen. In the Middle Ages in Europe, citizenship was primarily identified with commercial and secular life in the growing cities, and it came to be seen as membership in emerging nation-states. In modern democracies, citizenship has contrasting senses, including a liberal-individualist view emphasizing needs and entitlements and legal protections for essentially passive political beings, and a civic-republican view emphasizing political participation and seeing citizenship as an active relation with specific privileges and obligations.

While citizenship has varied considerably throughout history, there are some common elements of citizenship over time. Citizenship bonds extend beyond basic kinship ties to unite people of different genetic backgrounds, that is, citizenship is more than a clan or extended kinship network. It generally describes the relation between a person and an overall political entity such as a city-state or nation and signifies membership in that body. It is often based on, or a function of, some form of military service or expectation of future military service. It is generally characterized by some form of political participation, although the extent of such participation can vary considerably from minimal duties such as voting to active service in government. And citizenship, throughout history, has often been seen as an ideal state, closely allied with freedom, an important status with legal aspects including rights, and it has sometimes been seen as a bundle of rights or a right to have rights. Last, citizenship almost always has had an element of exclusion, in the sense that citizenship derives meaning, in part, by excluding non-citizens from basic rights and privileges.

== Overview ==
While a general definition of citizenship is membership in a political society or group, citizenship as a concept is difficult to define. Thinkers as far back as Aristotle realized that there was no agreed-upon definition of citizenship. And modern thinkers, as well, agree that the history of citizenship is complex with no single definition predominating. It is hard to isolate what citizenship means without reference to other terms such as nationalism, civil society, and democracy. According to one view, citizenship as a subject of study is undergoing transformation, with increased interest while the meaning of the term continues to shift. There is agreement citizenship is culture-specific: it is a function of each political culture. Further, how citizenship is seen and understood depends on the viewpoint of the person making the determination, such that a person from an upper class background will have a different notion of citizenship than a person from the lower class. The relation of citizenship has not been a fixed or static relation, but constantly changes within each society, and that according to one view, citizenship might "really have worked" only at select periods during certain times, such as when the Athenian politician Solon made reforms in the early Athenian state. The history of citizenship has sometimes been presented as a stark contrast between ancient citizenship and post-medieval times. One view is that citizenship should be studied as a long and direct progression throughout Western civilization, beginning from Ancient Greece or perhaps earlier, extending to the present; for example, thinker Feliks Gross examined citizenship as the "history of the continuation of a single institution." Other views question whether citizenship can be examined as a linear process, growing over time, usually for the better, and see the linear progression approach as an oversimplification possibly leading to incorrect conclusions. According to this view, citizenship should not be considered as a "progressive realisation of the core meanings that are definitionally built into citizenship." Another caveat, offered by some thinkers, is to avoid judging citizenship from one era in terms of the standards of another era; according to this view, citizenship should be understood by examining it within the context of a city-state or nation, and trying to understand it as people from these societies understood it. The rise of citizenship has been studied as an aspect of the development of law.

=== Table ===
Contrasting senses of citizenship from ancient times to the present day, according to Peter Zarrow:

| Ancient | Modern |
|---|---|
| Severely restricted | Almost universal |
| Embraced legal and communitarian strains | Most societies offer most privileges of citizenship, such as legal protections and social services |
| Rights matches status | No relation between rights |
| Citizens met face-to-face | Anonymous members of vast economic and political organisations |
| Public life valued for its own sake | |

== Ancient conceptions ==
=== Jewish people in the ancient world ===
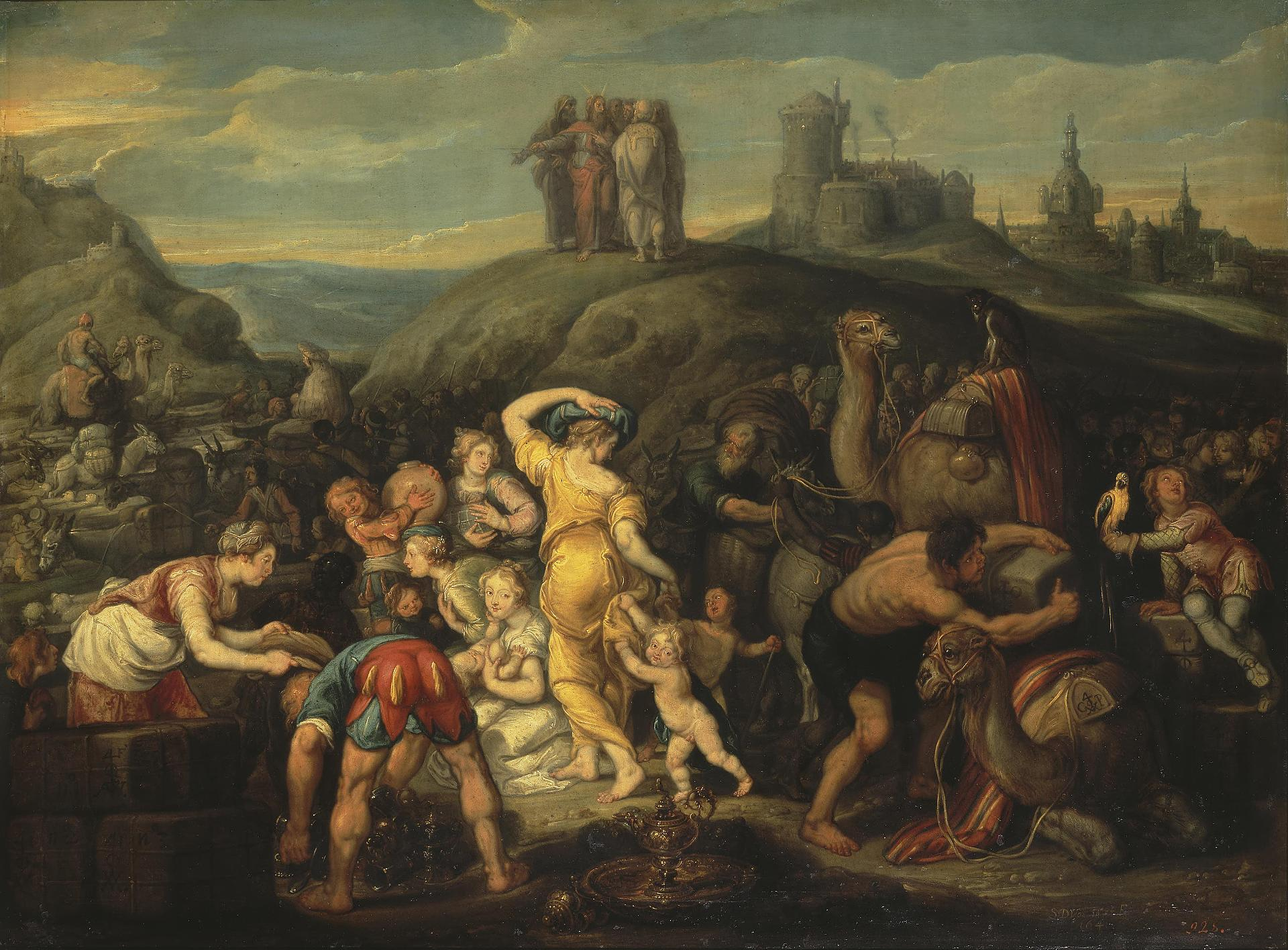
The Israelites preserved their identity as a people despite being enslaved by neighboring civilizations, and this sense of ethnic identity has been linked to the development of citizenship.

One view is that the beginning of citizenship dates back to the ancient Israelites. These people developed an understanding of themselves as a distinct and unique people—different from the Egyptians or Babylonians. They had a written history, common language and one-deity-only religion sometimes described as ethical monotheism. While most peoples developed a loose identity tied to a specific geographic location, the Jewish people kept their common identity despite being physically moved to different lands, such as when they were held captive as slaves in ancient Egypt or Babylon. The Jewish Covenant has been described as a binding agreement not just with a few people or tribal leaders, but between the whole nation of Israel, including men, women and children, with the Jewish deity Yahweh. Jews, similar to other tribal groups, did not see themselves as citizens per se but they formed a strong attachment to their own group, such that people of different ethnicities were considered as part of an "outgroup". This is in contrast to the modern understanding of citizenship as a way to accept people of different races and ethnicities under the umbrella of being citizens of a nation.

This said, there are several connected issues to be mentioned. First, ideologically the Israelites were very much against monarchy. Samuel very much tried to dissuade the people from having a king by pointing out the tyrannical nature of monarchy – in 1Sam 8:10–18 he indicates that the king has the right to take men for military service; women for domestic service; and land and a tenth part of the harvest, flocks, and herds for the support of the monarchy, and to require state service by both the people and their animals. Second, kings play almost no role in the five books of Moses. In all four books of Moses that precede Deuteronomy, there is no reference to the role of the king of Israel, not even where we would most expect to find it. See in also how the kingdom may be established to understand that the king has no role in the nation's establishment. Third, in Deut. 17, 16–17 the king is prevented from acquiring many wives, horses and amass a fortune. This has consequences on the powers of the king: wives – he cannot engage in diplomatic marriages, horses – he can't have large armies, fortune – obviously he lacks the economic power to pursue exaggerated kingly interests. "When he is seated on his royal throne, he shall write a copy of this Torah on a scroll before the Levitical priests." (Deut. 17:18) is almost the sole activity permitted to him. The Bible also encourages strong citizenship as shown in the examples of Abraham vs. God in the planned destruction of Sodom and the story of Gideon. We may conclude that while democracy arose in Athens it was not liberal democracy. Some of the liberal part of "liberal democracy" (limited government) arose in Jerusalem and its one of the many contributions of the Jews to the world. It would be difficult to exaggerate its contribution to the development of liberal democracy.

=== Ancient Greece ===
==== Polis citizenship ====
There is more widespread agreement that the first real instances of citizenship began in ancient Greece. And while there were precursors of the relation in societies before then, it emerged in readily discernible form in the Greek city-states which began to dot the shores of the Aegean Sea, the Black Sea, the Adriatic Sea, and elsewhere around the Mediterranean perhaps around the 8th century BCE. The modern day distinction sometimes termed consent versus descent distinction—that is, citizenship by choice versus birthright citizenship, has been traced back to ancient Greece. And thinkers such as J.G.A. Pocock have suggested that the modern-day ideal of citizenship was first articulated by the ancient Athenians and Romans, although he suggested that the "transmission" of the sense of citizenship over two millennia was essentially a myth enshrouding western civilization. One writer suggests that despite the long history of China, there never was a political entity within China similar to the Greek polis.

To the ancients, citizenship was a bond between a person and the city-state. Before Greek times, a person was generally connected to a tribe or kin-group such as an extended family, but citizenship added a layer to these ties—a non-kinship bond between the person and the state. Historian Geoffrey Hosking in his 2005 Modern Scholar lecture course suggested that citizenship in ancient Greece arose from an appreciation for the importance of freedom. Hosking explained:

It can be argued that this growth of slavery was what made Greeks particularly conscious of the value of freedom. After all, any Greek farmer might fall into debt and therefore might become a slave, at almost any time ... When the Greeks fought together, they fought in order to avoid being enslaved by warfare, to avoid being defeated by those who might take them into slavery. And they also arranged their political institutions so as to remain free men.

— Geoffrey Hosking, 2005

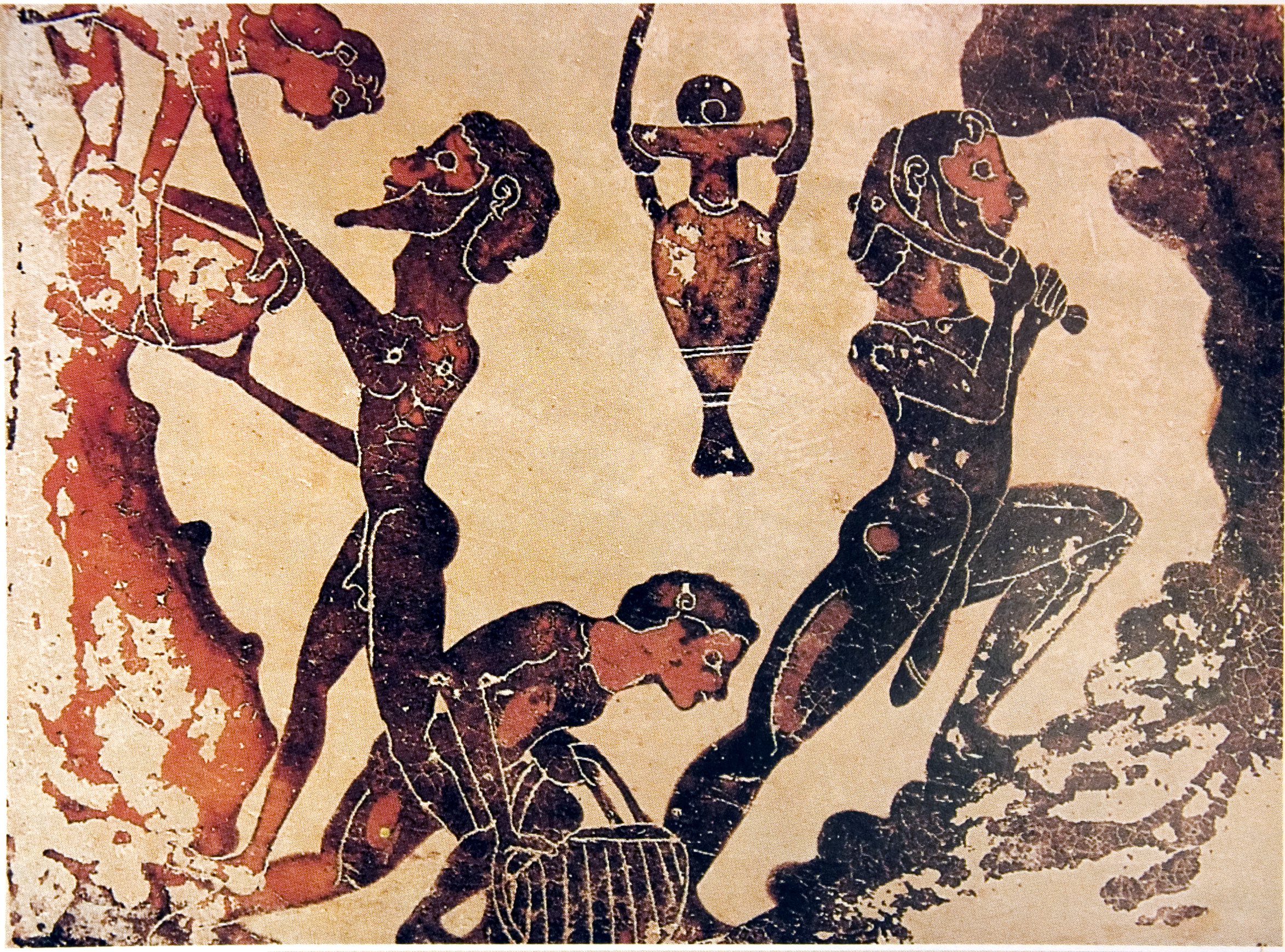
Slaves working in a mine. The sustenance provided by slaves meant that citizens had free time to participate in politics.

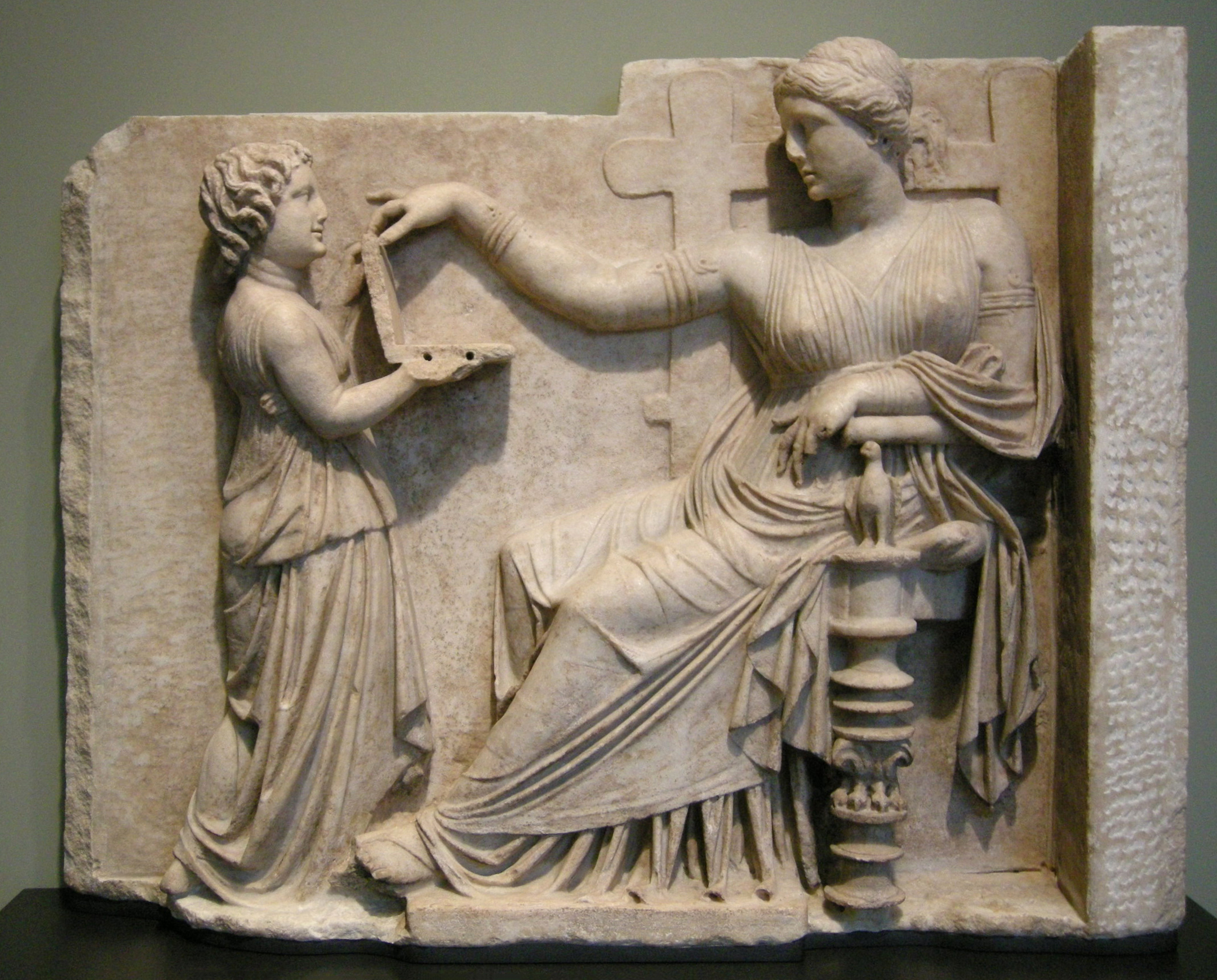
Geoffrey Hosking suggests that fear of being enslaved was a central motivating force for the development of the Greek sense of citizenship. Sculpture: a Greek woman being served by a slave-child.

The Greek sense of the polis, in which citizenship and the rule of law prevailed, was an important strategic advantage for the Greeks during their wars with Persia.

The polis was grounded in nomos, the rule of law, which meant that no man—no matter who he might be—was master, and all men were subject to the same rules. Any leader who set himself above the law was reckoned to be a tyrannos—a tyrant. It was also grounded in the notion of citizenship—the idea that every man born from the blood of the community has a share in power and responsibility. This notion that ... the proper way for us to live is as citizens in communities under the rule of law ... is an idea originated by the Greeks and bequeathed by them as their greatest contribution to the rest of mankind and history. It meant that Greeks were willing to live, fight, and die for their poleis...

— Robert L. Dise, Jr., 2009

Greeks could see the benefits of having slaves, since their labor permitted slaveowners to have substantial free time, enabling participation in public life. While Greeks were spread out in many separate city-states, they had many things in common in addition to shared ideas about citizenship: the Mediterranean trading world, kinship ties, the common Greek language, a shared hostility to the so-called non-Greek-speaking or barbarian peoples, belief in the prescience of the oracle at Delphi, and later on the early Olympic Games which involved generally peaceful athletic competitions between city-states. City-states often feuded with each other; one view was that regular wars were necessary to perpetuate citizenship, since the seized goods and slaves helped make the city-state rich, and that a long peaceful period meant ruin for citizenship.

An important aspect of polis citizenship was exclusivity. Polis meant both the political assembly as well as the entire society. Inequality of status was widely accepted. Citizens had a higher status than non-citizens, such as women, slaves or barbarians. For example, women were believed to be irrational and incapable of political participation, although a few writers, most notably Plato, disagreed. Methods used to determine whether someone could be a citizen or not could be based on wealth, identified by the amount of taxes one paid, or political participation, or heritage if both parents were citizens of the polis. The first form of citizenship was based on the way people lived in the ancient Greek times, in small-scale organic communities of the polis. Citizenship was not seen as a separate activity from the private life of the individual person, in the sense that there was not a distinction between public and private life. The obligations of citizenship were deeply connected into one's everyday life in the polis.

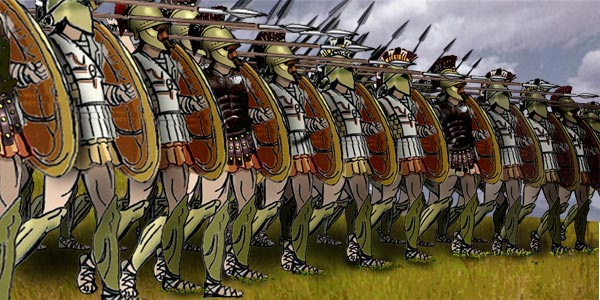
The Greek-style phalanx required close cohesion, since each soldier's shield protected the soldier to his left. Many thinkers link the phalanx to the development of citizenship.

The Greek sense of citizenship may have arisen from military necessity, since a key military formation demanded cohesion and commitment by each particular soldier. The phalanx formation had hoplite soldiers ranked shoulder-to-shoulder in a "compact mass" with each soldier's shield guarding the soldier to his left. If a single fighter failed to keep his position, then the entire formation could fall apart. Individual soldiers were generally protected provided that the entire mass stayed together. This technique called for large numbers of soldiers, sometimes involving most of the adult male population of a city-state, who supplied weapons at their own expense. The idea of citizenship, then, was that if each man had a say in whether the entire city-state should fight an adversary, and if each man was bound to the will of the group, then battlefield loyalty was much more likely. Political participation was thus linked with military effectiveness. In addition, the Greek city-states were the first instances in which judicial functions were separated from legislative functions in the law courts. Selected citizens served as jurors, and they were often paid a modest sum for their service. Greeks often despised tyrannical governments. In a tyrannical arrangement, there was no possibility of citizenship since political life was totally engineered to benefit the ruler.

==== Spartan citizenship ====
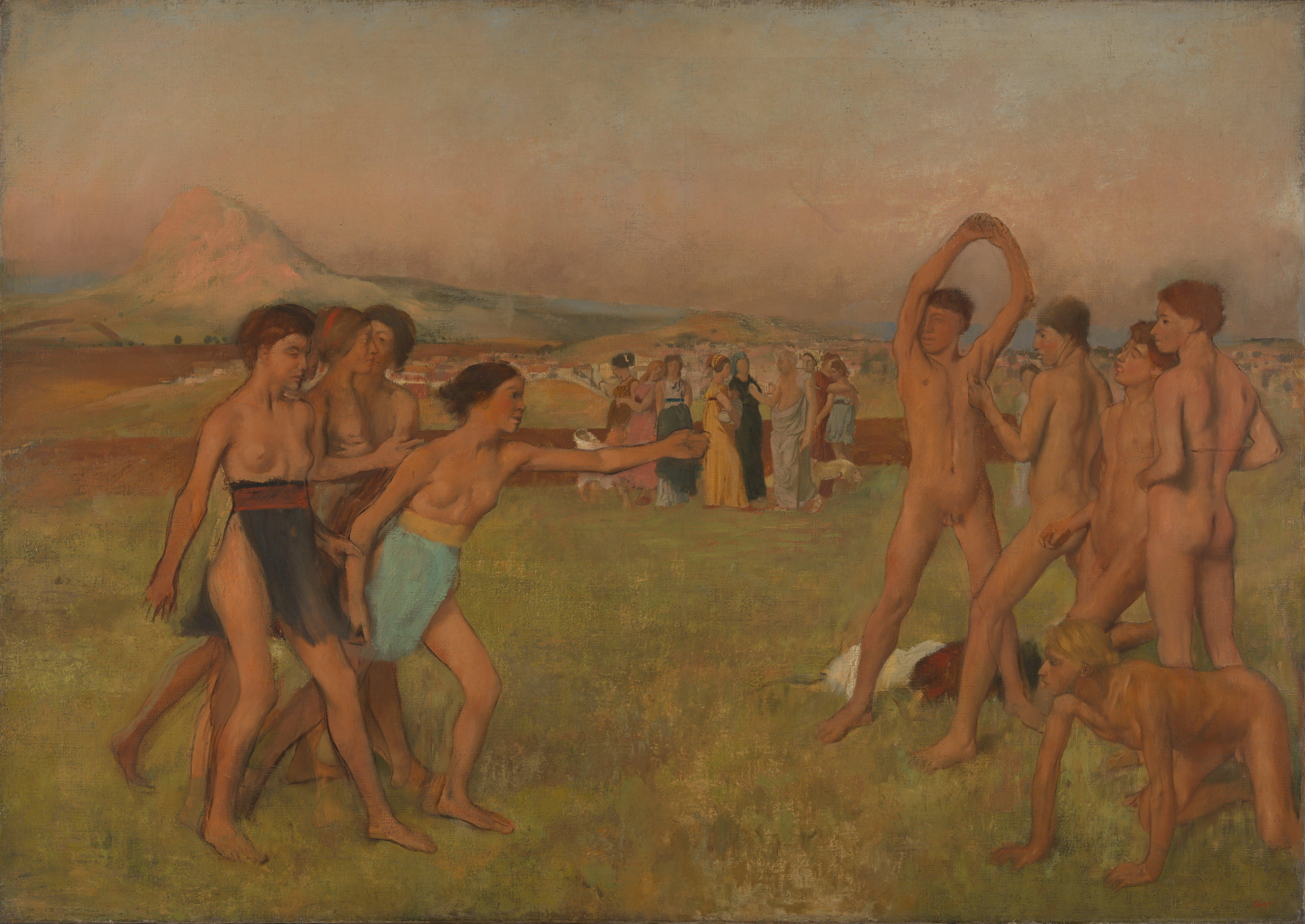
The culture of ancient Sparta valued physical exercise, often in the nude, with training for young men described as "ferociously fierce".

Several thinkers suggest that ancient Sparta, not Athens, was the originator of the concept of citizenship. Spartan citizenship was based on the principle of equality among a ruling military elite called Spartiates. They were "full Spartan citizens"—men who graduated from a rigorous regimen of military training and at age 30 received a land allotment called a kleros, although they had to keep paying dues to pay for food and drink as was required to maintain citizenship. In the Spartan approach to phalanx warfare, virtues such as courage and loyalty were particularly emphasized relative to other Greek city-states. Each Spartan citizen owned at least a minimum portion of the public land which was sufficient to provide food for a family, although the size of these plots varied. The Spartan citizens relied on the labor of captured slaves called helots to do the everyday drudgework of farming and maintenance, while the Spartan men underwent a rigorous military regimen, and in a sense it was the labor of the helots which permitted Spartans to engage in extensive military training and citizenship. Citizenship was viewed as incompatible with manual labor. Citizens ate meals together in a "communal mess". They were "frugally fed, ferociously disciplined, and kept in constant training through martial games and communal exercises," according to Hosking. As young men, they served in the military. It was seen as virtuous to participate in government when men grew older. Participation was required; failure to appear could entail a loss of citizenship. But the philosopher Aristotle viewed the Spartan model of citizenship as "artificial and strained", according to one account. While Spartans were expected to learn music and poetry, serious study was discouraged. Historian Ian Worthington described a "Spartan mirage" in the sense that the mystique about military invincibility tended to obscure weaknesses within the Spartan system, particularly their dependence on helots. In contrast with Athenian women, Spartan women could own property, and owned at one point up to 40% of the land according to Aristotle, and they had greater independence and rights, although their main task was not to rule the homes or participate in governance but rather to produce strong and healthy babies.

==== Athenian citizenship ====
In a book entitled Constitution of the Athenians, written in 350 BCE, the ancient Greek philosopher Aristotle suggested that ancient Greeks thought that being a citizen was a natural state, according to J. G. A. Pocock. It was an elitist notion, according to Peter Riesenberg, in which small scale communities had generally similar ideas of how people should behave in society and what constituted appropriate conduct. Geoffrey Hosking described a possible Athenian logic leading to participatory democracy:

If you've got a lot of soldiers of rather modest means, and you want them to enthusiastically participate in war, then you've got to have a political and economic system which doesn't allow too many of them to fall into debt, because debt ultimately means slavery, and slaves cannot fight in the army. And it needs a political system which gives them a say on matters that concern their lives.

— Geoffrey Hosking, 2005

As a consequence, the original Athenian aristocratic constitution gradually became more inappropriate, and gave way to a more inclusive arrangement. In the early 6th century BCE, the reformer Solon replaced the Draconian constitution with the Solonian Constitution. Solon canceled all existing land debts, and enabled free Athenian males to participate in the assembly or ecclesia. In addition, he encouraged foreign craftsmen, particularly skilled in pottery, to move to Athens and offered citizenship by naturalization as an incentive.

Solon expected that aristocratic Athenians would continue running affairs but nevertheless citizens had a "political voice in the Assembly."

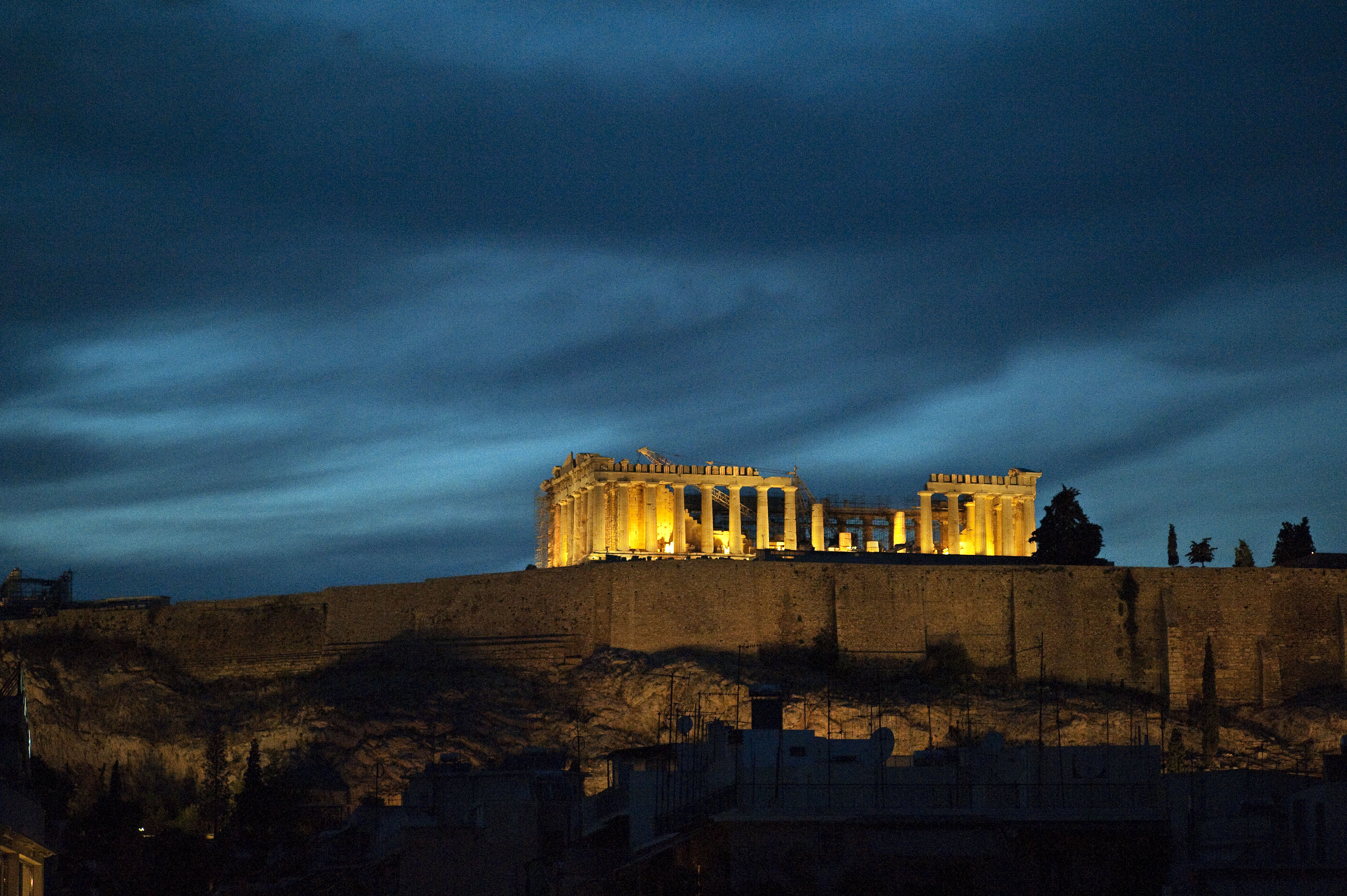
The Athenian conception of citizenship reflected a desire for freedom itself. Photo: Parthenon.

Subsequent reformers moved Athens even more towards direct democracy. The Greek reformer Cleisthenes in 508 BCE re-engineered Athenian society from organizations based on family-style groupings, or phratries, to larger mixed structures which combined people from different types of geographic areas—coastal areas and cities, hinterlands, and plains—into the same group. Cleisthenes abolished the tribes by "redistributing their identity so radically" so they ceased to exist. The result was that farmers, sailors and sheepherders came together in the same political unit, in effect lessening kinship ties as a basis for citizenship. In this sense, Athenian citizenship extended beyond basic bonds such as ties of family, descent, religion, race, or tribal membership, and reached towards the idea of a civic multiethnic state built on democratic principles.

Cleisthenes took democracy to the masses in a way that Solon didn't. ... Cleisthenes gave these same people the opportunity to participate in a political system in which all citizens—noble and non-noble—were in theory equal, and regardless of where they lived in Attica, could take part in some form of state administration.

— Ian Worthington, 2009

According to Feliks Gross, such an arrangement can succeed if people from different backgrounds can form constructive associations. The Athenian practice of ostracism, in which citizens could vote anonymously for a fellow citizen to be expelled from Athens for up to ten years, was seen as a way to pre-emptively remove a possible threat to the state, without having to go through legal proceedings. It was intended to promote internal harmony.

Athenian citizenship was based on obligations of citizens towards the community rather than rights given to its members. This was not a problem because people had a strong affinity with the polis; their personal destiny and the destiny of the entire community were strongly linked. Also, citizens of the polis saw obligations to the community as an opportunity to be virtuous. It was a source of honour and respect. According to one view, the citizenry was "its own master". The people were sovereign; there was no sovereignty outside of the people themselves. In Athens, citizens were both ruler and ruled. Further, important political and judicial offices were rotated to widen participation and prevent corruption, and all citizens had the right to speak and vote in the political assembly. Pocock explained:

... what makes the citizen the highest order of being is his capacity to rule, and it follows that rule over one's equal is possible only where one's equal rules over one. Therefore the citizen rules and is ruled; citizens join each other in making decisions where each decider respects the authority of the others, and all join in obeying the decisions (now known as "laws") they have made.

— J.G.A. Pocock

The Athenian conception was that "laws that should govern everybody," in the sense of equality under the law or the Greek term isonomia. Citizens had certain rights and duties: the rights included the chance to speak and vote in the common assembly, to stand for public office, to serve as jurors, to be protected by the law, to own land, and to participate in public worship; duties included an obligation to obey the law, and to serve in the armed forces which could be "costly" in terms of buying or making expensive war equipment or in risking one's own life, according to Hosking.

This balance of participation, obligations and rights constituted the essence of citizenship, together with the feeling that there was a common interest which imposed its obligations on everyone.

— Geoffrey Hosking, 2005

Hosking noticed that citizenship was "relatively narrowly distributed" and excluded all women, all minors, all slaves, all immigrants, and most colonials, that is, citizens who left their city to start another usually lost their rights from their city-state of origin. Many historians felt this exclusiveness was a weakness in Athenian society, according to Hosking, but he noted that there were perhaps 50,000 Athenian citizens overall, and that at most, a tenth of these ever took part in an actual assembly at any one time. Hosking argued that if citizenship had been spread more widely, it would have hurt solidarity. Pocock expresses a similar sentiment and noted that citizenship requires a certain distance from the day-to-day drudgery of daily living. Greek males solved this problem to some extent with the subjugation of women as well as the institution of slavery which freed their schedules so they could participate in the assembly. Pocock asked: for citizenship to happen, was it necessary to prevent free people from becoming "too much involved in the world of things"? Or, could citizenship be extended to working class persons, and if so, what does this mean for the nature of citizenship itself?

==== Plato on citizenship ====
The philosopher Plato envisioned a warrior class similar to the Spartan conception in that these persons did not engage in farming, business, or handicrafts, but their main duty was to prepare for war: to train, to exercise, to train, to exercise, constantly. Like the Spartan practice, Plato's idealized community was one of citizens who kept common meals to build common bonds. Citizenship status, in Plato's ideal view, was inherited. There were four separate classes. There were penalties for failing to vote. A key part of citizenship was obeying the law and being "deferent to the social and political system" and having internal self-control.

==== Aristotle on citizenship ====
Writing a generation after Plato, and in contrast with his teacher, Aristotle did not like Sparta's commune-oriented approach. He felt Sparta's land allocation system as well as the communal meals led to a world in which rich and poor were polarized. He recognized differences in citizenship patterns based on age: the young were "underdeveloped" citizens, while the elderly were "superannuated" citizens. And he noted that it was hard to classify the citizenship status of some persons, such as resident aliens who still had access to courts, or citizens who had lost their citizenship franchise.

Still, Aristotle's conception of citizenship was that it was a legally guaranteed role in creating and running government. It reflected the division of labor which he believed was a good thing; citizenship, in his view, was a commanding role in society with citizens ruling over non-citizens. At the same time, there could not be a permanent barrier between the rulers and the ruled, according to Aristotle's conception, and if there was such a barrier, citizenship could not exist. Aristotle's sense of citizenship depended on a "rigorous separation of public from private, of polis from oikos, of persons and actions from things" which allowed people to interact politically with equals. To be truly human, one had to be an active citizen to the community:

To take no part in the running of the community's affairs is to be either a beast or a god!

— Aristotle

In Aristotle's view, "man is a political animal". Isolated men were not truly free, in his view. A beast was animal-like without self-control over passions and unable to coordinate with other beasts, and therefore could not be a citizen. And a god was so powerful and immortal that he or she did not need help from others. In Aristotle's conception, citizenship was possible generally in a small city-state since it required direct participation in public affairs with people knowing "one another's characters". What mattered, according to Pocock's interpretation of Aristotle, was that citizens had the freedom to take part in political discussions if they chose to do so. And citizenship was not merely a means to being free, but was freedom itself, a valued escape from the home-world of the oikos to the political world of the polis. It meant active sharing in civic life, meaning that all men rule, and are ruled, alternatively. And citizens were those who shared in deliberative and judicial office, and in that sense, attained the status of citizenship. What citizens do should benefit not just a segment of society, but be in the interest of everybody. Unlike Plato, Aristotle believed that women were incapable of citizenship since it did not suit their natures. In Aristotle's conception, humans are destined "by nature" to live in a political association and take short turns at ruling, inclusively, participating in making legislative, judicial and executive decisions. But Aristotle's sense of "inclusiveness" was limited to adult Greek males born in the polity: women, children, slaves, and foreigners (that is, resident aliens), were generally excluded from political participation.

=== Roman conceptions ===
==== Differences from Greece ====
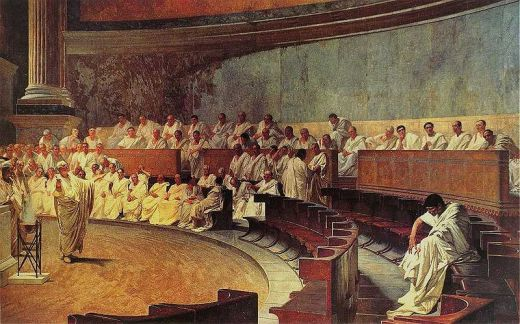
During the Roman Republic, soldiers of the army met in a democratic assembly called the Centuriate Assembly which gathered for legislative, electoral, and military purposes. But the participation of most Roman citizens in politics waned as Rome grew.

Roman citizenship was similar to the Greek model but differed in substantive ways. Geoffrey Hosking argued that Greek ideas of citizenship in the city-state, such as the principles of equality under the law, civic participation in government, and notions that "no one citizen should have too much power for too long", were carried forth into the Roman world. But unlike the Greek city-states which enslaved captured peoples following a war, Rome offered relatively generous terms to its captives, including chances for captives to have a "second category of Roman citizenship". Conquered peoples could not vote in the Roman assembly but had full protections of the law, and could make economic contracts and could marry Roman citizens. They blended together with Romans in a culture sometimes described as Romanitas—ceremonies, public baths, games, and a common culture helped unite diverse groups within the empire.

One view was that the Greek sense of citizenship was an "emancipation from the world of things" in which citizens essentially acted upon other citizens; material things were left back in the private domestic world of the oikos. But the Roman sensibility took into account to a greater extent that citizens could act upon material things as well as other citizens, in the sense of buying or selling property, possessions, titles, goods. Accordingly, citizens often encountered other citizens on the basis of commerce which often required regulation. It introduced a new level of complexity regarding the concept of citizenship. Pocock explained:

The person was defined and represented through his actions upon things; in the course of time, the term property came to mean, first, the defining characteristic of a human or other being; second, the relation which a person had with a thing; and third, the thing defined as the possession of some person.

— J. G. A. Pocock, 1988

==== Class concerns ====
A further departure from the Greek model was that the Roman government pitted the upper-class patrician interests against the lower-order working groups known as the plebeian class in a dynamic arrangement, sometimes described as a "tense tug-of-war" between the dignity of the great man and the liberty of the small man. Through worker discontent, the plebs threatened to set up a rival city to Rome, and through negotiation around 494 BCE, won the right to have their interests represented in government by officers known as tribunes. The Roman Republic, according to Hosking, tried to find a balance between the upper and lower classes. And writers such as Burchell have argued that citizenship meant different things depending on what social class one belonged to: for upper-class men, citizenship was an active chance to influence public life; for lower-class men, it was about a respect for "private rights" or ius privatum.

==== A legal relation ====
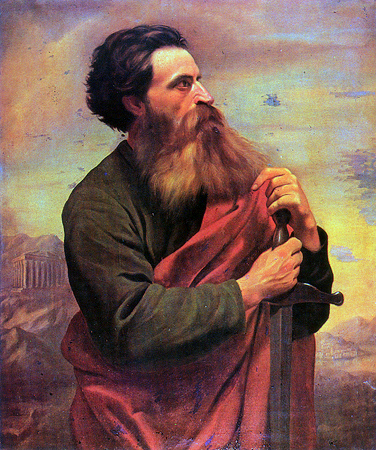
Saint Paul declared that he was a Roman citizen and therefore deserved to be treated with fairness before the law.

Pocock explained that a citizen came to be understood as a person "free to act by law, free to ask and expect the law's protection, a citizen of such and such a legal community, of such and such a legal standing in that community." An example was Saint Paul demanding fair treatment after his arrest by claiming to be a Roman citizen. Many thinkers including Pocock suggested that the Roman conception of citizenship had a greater emphasis than the Greek one of it being a legal relationship with the state, described as the "legal and political shield of a free person". And citizenship was believed to have had a "cosmopolitan character". Citizenship meant having rights to have possessions, immunities, expectations, which were "available in many kinds and degrees, available or unavailable to many kinds of person for many kinds of reason." Citizens could "sue and be sued in certain courts". And the law, itself, was a kind of bond uniting people, in the sense of it being the results of past decisions by the assembly, such that citizenship came to mean "membership in a community of shared or common law". According to Pocock, the Roman emphasis on law changed the nature of citizenship: it was more impersonal, universal, multiform, having different degrees and applications. It included many different types of citizenship: sometimes municipal citizenship, sometimes empire-wide citizenship.

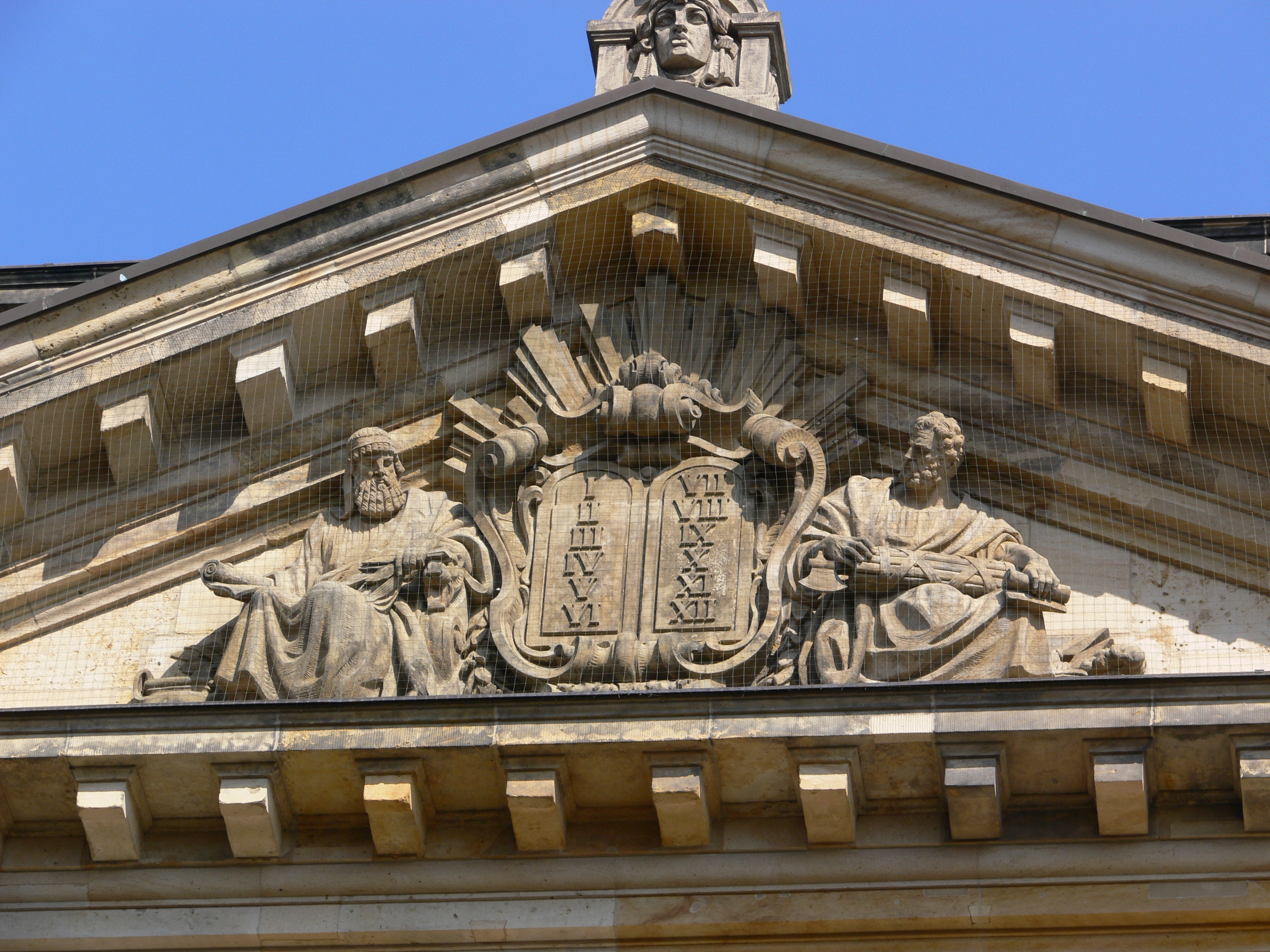
The Twelve Tables inscribed law in stone, and protected citizenship since the law was plainly visible for everybody to see.

Law continued to advance as a subject under the Romans. The Romans developed law into a kind of science known as jurisprudence. Law helped protect citizens:

The college of priests agreed to have basic laws inscribed upon twelve stone tablets displayed in the forum for everyone to see ... Inscribing these things on stone tablets was very important because it meant, first of all, that law was stable and permanent; the same for everyone, and it could not be altered at the whim of powerful people. And secondly, it was publicly known; it was not secret; it could be consulted by anybody at any time.

— Geoffrey Hosking, 2005

Specialists in law found ways to adapt the fixed laws, and to have the common law or jus gentium, work in harmony with natural law or ius naturale, which are rules common to all things. Property was protected by law, and served as a protection of individuals against the power of the state. In addition, unlike the Greek model where laws were mostly made in the assembly, Roman law was often determined in other places than official government bodies. Rules could originate through court rulings, by looking to past court rulings, by sovereign decrees, and the effect was that the assembly's power became increasingly marginalized.

==== Expansion of citizenship ====
In the Roman Empire, polis citizenship expanded from small scale communities to the entire empire. In the early years of the Roman Republic, citizenship was a prized relationship which was not widely extended. Romans realised that granting citizenship to people from all over the empire legitimized Roman rule over conquered areas. As the centuries went by, citizenship was no longer a status of political agency, but it had been reduced to a judicial safeguard and the expression of rule and law. The Roman conception of citizenship was relatively more complex and nuanced than the earlier Athenian conception, and it usually did not involve political participation. There was a "multiplicity of roles" for citizens to play, and this sometimes led to "contradictory obligations". Roman citizenship was not a single black-and-white category of citizen versus non-citizen, but rather there were more gradations and relationships possible. Women were respected to a greater extent with a secure status as what Hosking terms "subsidiary citizens".

But the citizenship rules generally had the effect of building loyalty throughout the empire among highly diverse populations. The Roman statesman Cicero, while encouraging political participation, saw that too much civic activism could have consequences that were possibly dangerous and disruptive. David Burchell argued that in Cicero's time, there were too many citizens pushing to "enhance their dignitas", and the result of a "political stage" with too many actors all wanting to play a leading role, was discord. The problem of extreme inequality of landed wealth led to a decline in the citizen-soldier arrangement, and was one of many causes leading to the dissolution of the Republic and rule by dictators. The Roman Empire gradually expanded the inclusiveness of persons considered as "citizens", while the economic power of persons declined, and fewer men wanted to serve in the military. The granting of citizenship to wide swaths of non-Roman groups diluted its meaning, according to one account.

==== Decline of Rome ====
When the Western Roman empire fell in 476 AD, the western part run by Rome was sacked, while the eastern empire headquartered at Constantinople endured. Some thinkers suggest that as a result of historical circumstances, western Europe evolved with two competing sources of authority—religious and secular—and that the ensuing separation of church and state was a "major step" in bringing forth the modern sense of citizenship. In the eastern half which survived, religious and secular authority were merged in the one emperor. The eastern Roman emperor Justinian, who ruled the eastern empire from 527 to 565, thought that citizenship meant people living with honor, not causing harm, and to "give each their due" in relation with fellow citizens.

== Early modern ideas of citizenship ==
=== Feudalism ===
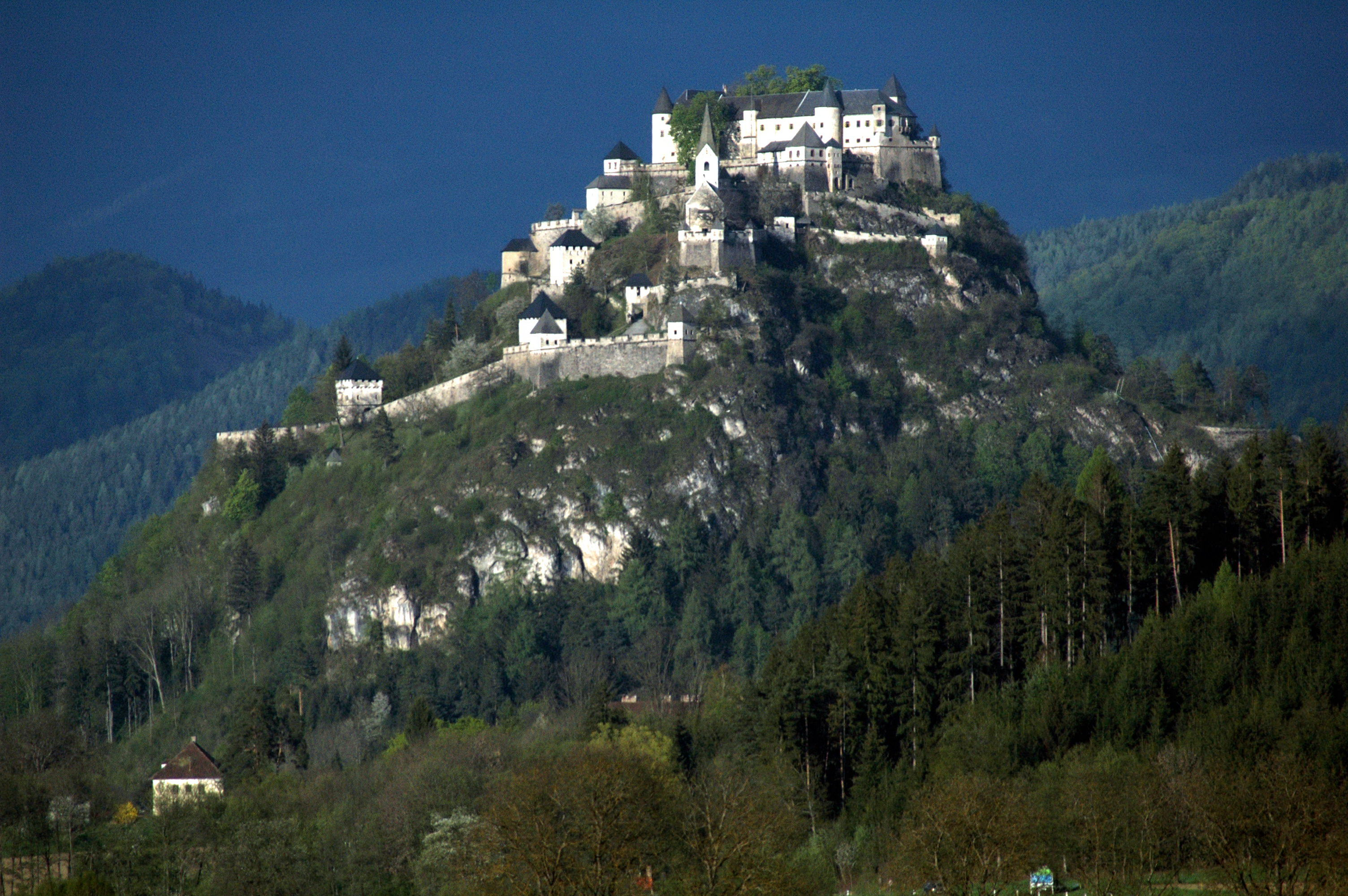
During the Middle Ages, the lord-vassal relation dominated; vassals provided service and loyalty, while lords provided protection.

In the feudal system, there were relationships characterized as reciprocal, with bonds between lords and vassals going both ways: vassals promised loyalty and subsistence, while lords promised protection. The basis of feudal arrangement was control over land. The loyalty of a person was not to a law, or to a constitution, or to an abstract concept such as a nation, but to a person, namely, the next higher-level up, such as a knight, lord, or king. One view is that feudalism's reciprocal obligation system gave rise to the idea of the individual and the citizen. According to a related view, Magna Carta, while a sort of "feudal document", marked a transition away from feudalism since the document was not a personal unspoken bond between nobles and the king, but rather was more like a contract between two parties, written in formal language, describing how different parties were supposed to behave towards each other. Magna Carta gave assurances that the liberty, security and freedom of individuals were "inviolable". Gradually the personal ties linking vassals with lords were replaced with contractual and more impersonal relationships.

The early days of medieval communes were marked by intensive citizenship, according to one view. Sometimes there was terrific religious activism, spurred by fanatics and religious zealotry, and as a result of the discord and religious violence, Europeans learned to value the "dutiful passive citizen" as much preferred to the "self-directed religious zealot", according to another.

=== Renaissance Italy ===
According to historian Andrew C. Fix, Italy in the 14th century was much more urbanized than the rest of Europe, with major populations concentrated in cities like Milan, Rome, Genoa, Pisa, Florence, Venice and Naples. Trade in spices with the Middle East, and new industries such as wool and clothing, led to greater prosperity, which in turn permitted greater education and study of the liberal arts, particularly among urbanized youth. A philosophy of Studia Humanitatis, later called humanism, emerged with an emphasis away from the church and towards secularism; thinkers reflected on the study of ancient Rome and ancient Greece including its ideas of citizenship and politics. Competition among the cities helped spur thinking.

Fix suggested that of the northern Italian cities, it was Florence which most closely resembled a true Republic, whereas most Italian cities were "complex oligarchies ruled by groups of rich citizens called patricians, the commercial elite." Florence's city leaders figured that civic education was crucial to the protection of the Republic, so that citizens and leaders could cope with future unexpected crises. Politics, previously "shunned as unspiritual", came to be viewed as a "worthy and honorable vocation", and it was expected that most sectors of the public, from the richer commercial classes and patricians, to workers and the lower classes, should participate in public life. A new sense of citizenship began to emerge based on an "often turbulent internal political life in the towns", according to Fix, with competition among guilds and "much political debate and confrontation".

=== Early European towns ===
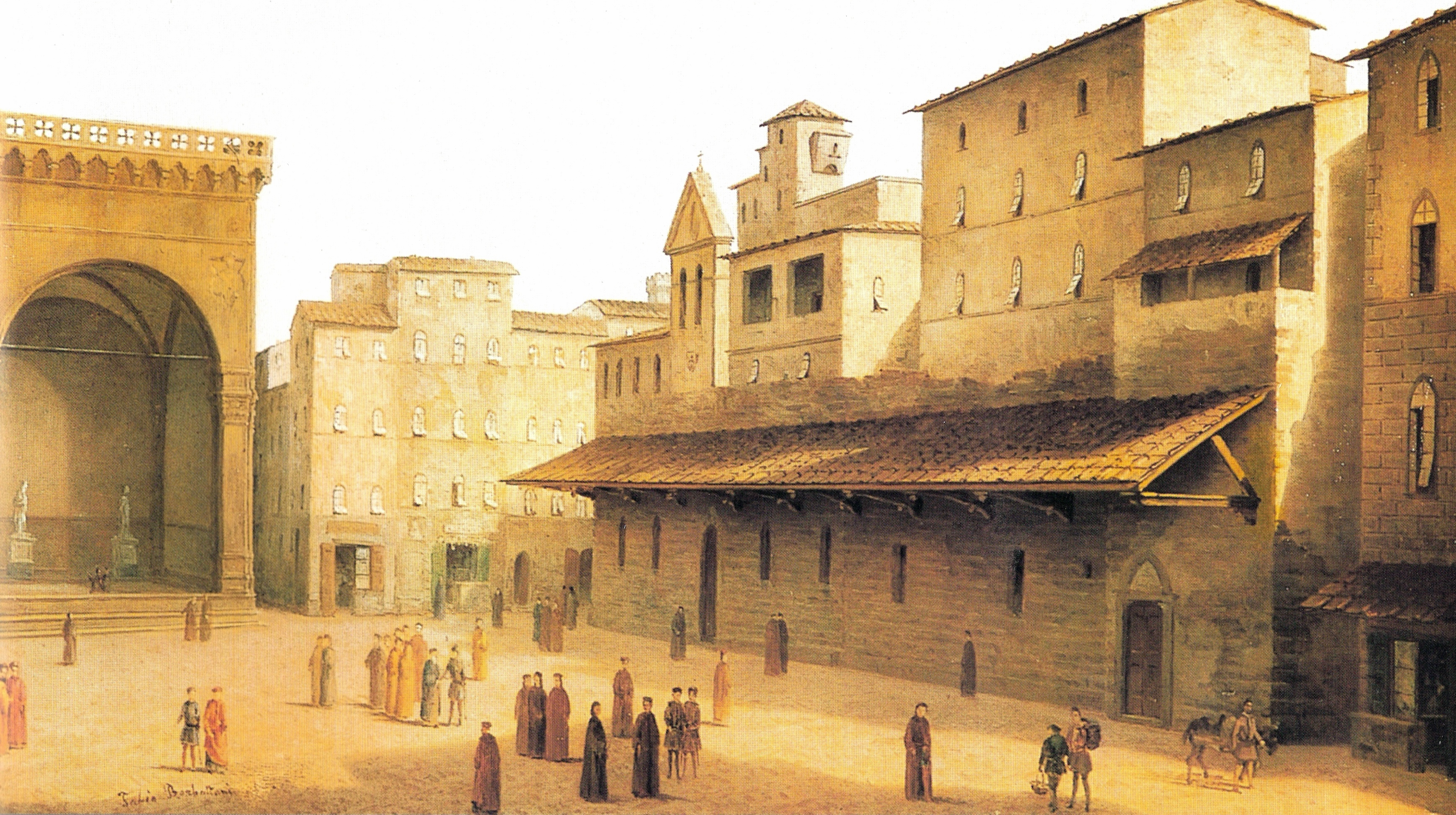
Emerging cities such as Florence gave people new opportunities to be a citizen of their city, or participate in a guild, or serve on a town council.

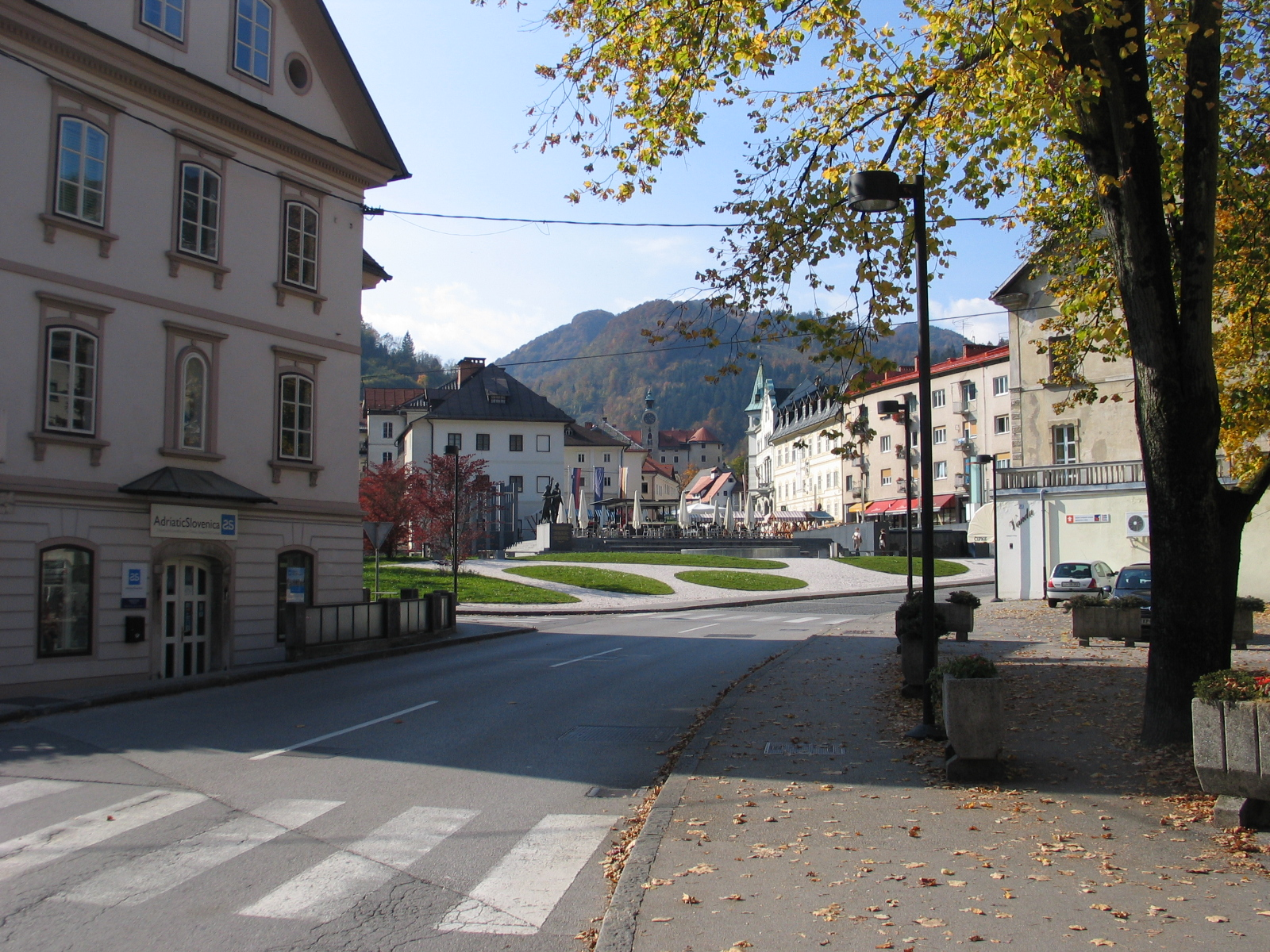
An emerging phenomenon dubbed the public sphere emerged in Europe, a space between government authority and private life, in which citizens could have rational-critical discussions in town squares like this one about government decisions, and form public opinion as a counterweight to authority.

During the Renaissance and growth of Europe, medieval political scholar Walter Ullmann suggested that the essence of the transition was from people being subjects of a monarch or lord to being citizens of a city and later to a nation. A distinguishing characteristic of a city was having its own law, courts, and independent administration. And being a citizen often meant being subject to the city's law in addition to helping to choose officials. Cities were defensive entities, and its citizens were persons who were "economically competent to bear arms, to equip and train themselves." According to one theorist, the requirement that individual citizen-soldiers provide their own equipment for fighting helped to explain why Western cities evolved the concept of citizenship, while Eastern ones generally did not. And city dwellers who had fought alongside nobles in battles were no longer content with having a subordinate social status, but demanded a greater role in the form of citizenship. In addition to city administration as a way of participating in political decision-making, membership in guilds was an indirect form of citizenship in that it helped their members succeed financially; guilds exerted considerable political influence in the growing towns.

=== Emerging nation-states ===
During European Middle Ages, citizenship was usually associated with cities. Nobility in the aristocracy used to have privileges of a higher nature than commoners. The rise of citizenship was linked to the rise of republicanism, according to one account, since if a republic belongs to its citizens, then kings have less power. In the emerging nation-states, the territory of the nation was its land, and citizenship was an idealized concept. Increasingly, citizenship related not to a person such as a lord or count, but rather citizenship related a person to the state on the basis of more abstract terms such as rights and duties.

Citizenship was increasingly seen as a result of birth, that is, a birthright. But nations often welcomed foreigners with vital skills and capabilities, and came to accept these new people under a process of naturalization. Increasing frequency of cases of naturalization helped people see citizenship as a relationship which was freely chosen by people. Citizens were people who voluntarily chose allegiance to the state, who accepted the legal status of citizenship with its rights and responsibilities, who obeyed its laws, who were loyal to the state.

=== Great Britain ===
The early modern period saw significant social change in Great Britain in terms of the position of individuals in society and the growing power of Parliament in relation to the monarch.

The English Reformation ushered in political, constitutional, social and cultural change in the 16th century. Moreover, it defined a national identity for England and slowly, but profoundly, changed people's religious beliefs and established the Church of England.

In the 17th century, there was renewed interest in Magna Carta. English common law judge Sir Edward Coke revived the idea of rights based on citizenship by arguing that Englishmen had historically enjoyed such rights. Passage of the Petition of Right in 1628 and Habeas Corpus Act in 1679 established certain liberties for subjects in statute. The idea of a political party took form with groups debating rights to political representation during the Putney Debates of 1647. After the English Civil Wars (1642–1651) and the Glorious Revolution of 1688, the Bill of Rights was enacted in 1689, which codified certain rights and liberties. The Parliament of Scotland passed the Claim of Right 1689. These Acts set out the requirement for regular elections, rules for freedom of speech in Parliament and limited the power of the monarch, ensuring that, unlike much of Europe at the time, royal absolutism would not prevail.

Across Europe, the Age of Enlightenment in the 17th and 18th centuries spread new ideas about liberty, reason and politics across the continent and beyond.

=== American Revolution ===
British colonists across the Atlantic had grown up in a system in which local government was democratic, marked by participation by affluent men, but after the French and Indian War, colonists came to resent an increase in taxes imposed by Britain to offset expenses. What was particularly irksome to colonists was their lack of representation in the British Parliament, and the phrase no taxation without representation became a common grievance. The struggle between rebelling colonists and British troops was a time when citizenship "worked", according to one view. American and subsequent French declarations of rights were instrumental in linking the notion of fundamental rights to popular sovereignty in the sense that governments drew their legitimacy and authority from the consent of the governed. The Framers designed the United States Constitution to accommodate a rapidly growing republic by opting for representative democracy as opposed to direct democracy, but this arrangement challenged the idea of citizenship in the sense that citizens were, in effect, choosing other persons to represent them and take their place in government. The revolutionary spirit created a sense of "broadening inclusion". The Constitution specified a three-part structure of government with a federal government and state governments, but it did not specify the relation of citizenship. The Bill of Rights protected the rights of individuals from intrusion by the federal government, although it had little impact on judgements by the courts for the first 130 years after ratification. The term citizen was not defined by the Constitution until the Fourteenth Amendment was added in 1868, which defined United States citizenship to include "All persons born or naturalized in the United States, and subject to the jurisdiction thereof." The American Revolution demonstrated that it was plausible for Enlightenment ideas about how a government should be organized to actually be put into practice.

=== French Revolution ===
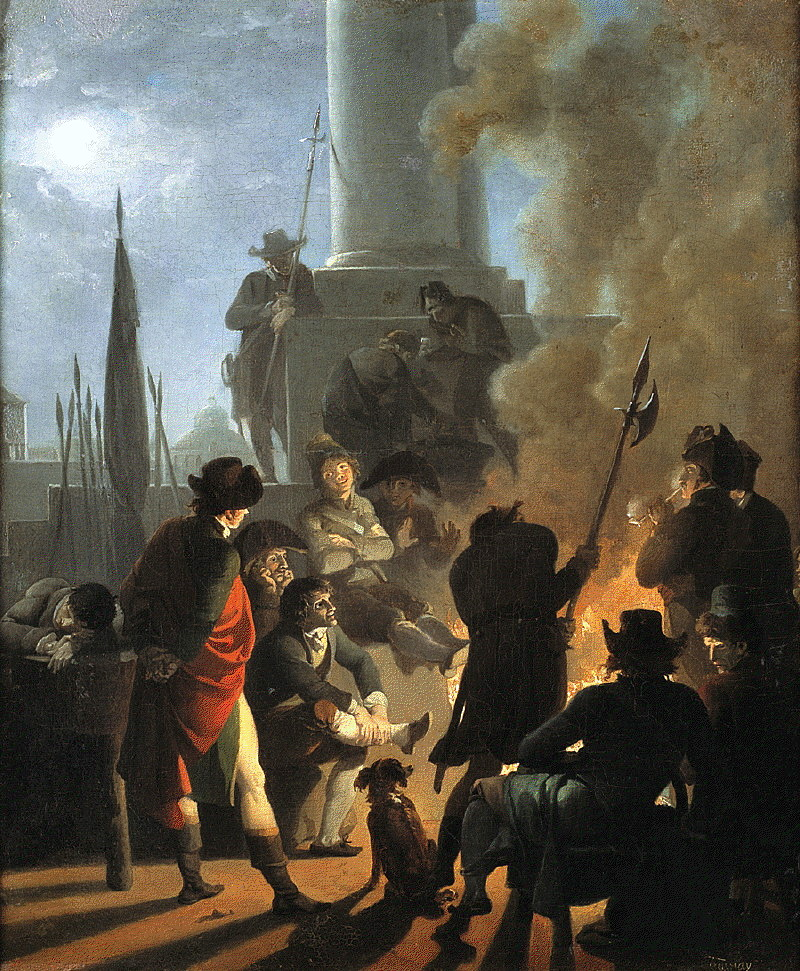
Painting recreating a scene from the French Revolution. It linked citizenship with popular sovereignty.

The French Revolution marked major changes and has been widely seen as a watershed event in modern politics. Up until then, the main ties between people under the Ancien Regime were hierarchical, such that each person owed loyalty to the next person further up the chain of command; for example, serfs were loyal to local vassals, who in turn were loyal to nobles, who in turn were loyal to the king, who in turn was presumed to be loyal to God. Clergy and aristocracy had special privileges, including preferential treatment in law courts, and were exempt from taxes; this last privilege had the effect of placing the burden of paying for national expenses on the peasantry. One scholar who examined pre-Revolutionary France described powerful groups which stifled citizenship and included provincial estates, guilds, military governors, courts with judges who owned their offices, independent church officials, proud nobles, financiers and tax farmers. They blocked citizenship indirectly since they kept a small elite governing group in power, and kept regular people away from participating in political decision-making.

These arrangements changed substantially during and after the French Revolution. Louis XVI mismanaged funds, vacillated, was blamed for inaction during a famine, causing the French people to see the interest of the king and the national interest as opposed. During the early stages of the uprising, the abolition of aristocratic privilege happened during a pivotal meeting on August 4, 1789, in which an aristocrat named Vicomte de Noailles proclaimed before the National Assembly that he would renounce all special privileges and would henceforward be known only as the "Citizen of Noailles." Other aristocrats joined him which helped to dismantle the Ancien Regime's seignorial rights during "one night of heated oratory", according to one historian. Later that month, the Assembly's Declaration of the Rights of Man and of the Citizen linked the concept of rights with citizenship and asserted that rights of man were "natural, inalienable, and sacred", that all men were "born free and equal, and that the aim of all political association is maintenance of their rights", according to historian Robert Bucholz. However, the document said nothing about the rights of women, although activist Olympe de Gouge issued a proclamation two years later which argued that women were born with equal rights to men. People began to identify a new loyalty to the nation as a whole, as citizens, and the idea of popular sovereignty earlier espoused by the thinker Rousseau took hold, along with strong feelings of nationalism. Louis XVI and his wife were guillotined.

Citizenship became more inclusive and democratic, aligned with rights and national membership. The king's government was replaced with an administrative hierarchy at all levels, from a national legislature to even power at the local commune, such that power ran both up and down the chain of command. Loyalty became a cornerstone in the concept of citizenship, according to Peter Riesenberg. One analyst suggested that in the French Revolution, two often polar-opposite versions of citizenship merged: (1) the abstract idea of citizenship as equality before the law caused by the centralizing and rationalizing policies of absolute monarchs and (2) the idea of citizenship as a privileged status reserved for rule-makers, brought forth defensively by an aristocratic elite guarding its exclusiveness. According to one view by the German philosopher Max Stirner, the Revolution emancipated the citizen but not the individual, since the individuals were not the agents of change, but only the collective force of all individuals; in Stirner's sense, the "agent of change" was effectively the nation. The British thinker T. H. Marshall saw in the 18th century "serious growth" of civil rights, with major growth in the legal aspects of citizenship, often defended through courts of law. These civil rights extended citizenship's legal dimensions: they included the right to free speech, the right to a fair trial, and generally equal access to the legal system. Marshall saw the 18th century as signifying civil rights which was a precursor to political rights such as suffrage, and later, in the 20th century, social rights such as welfare.

=== Early modern: 1700s–1800s ===
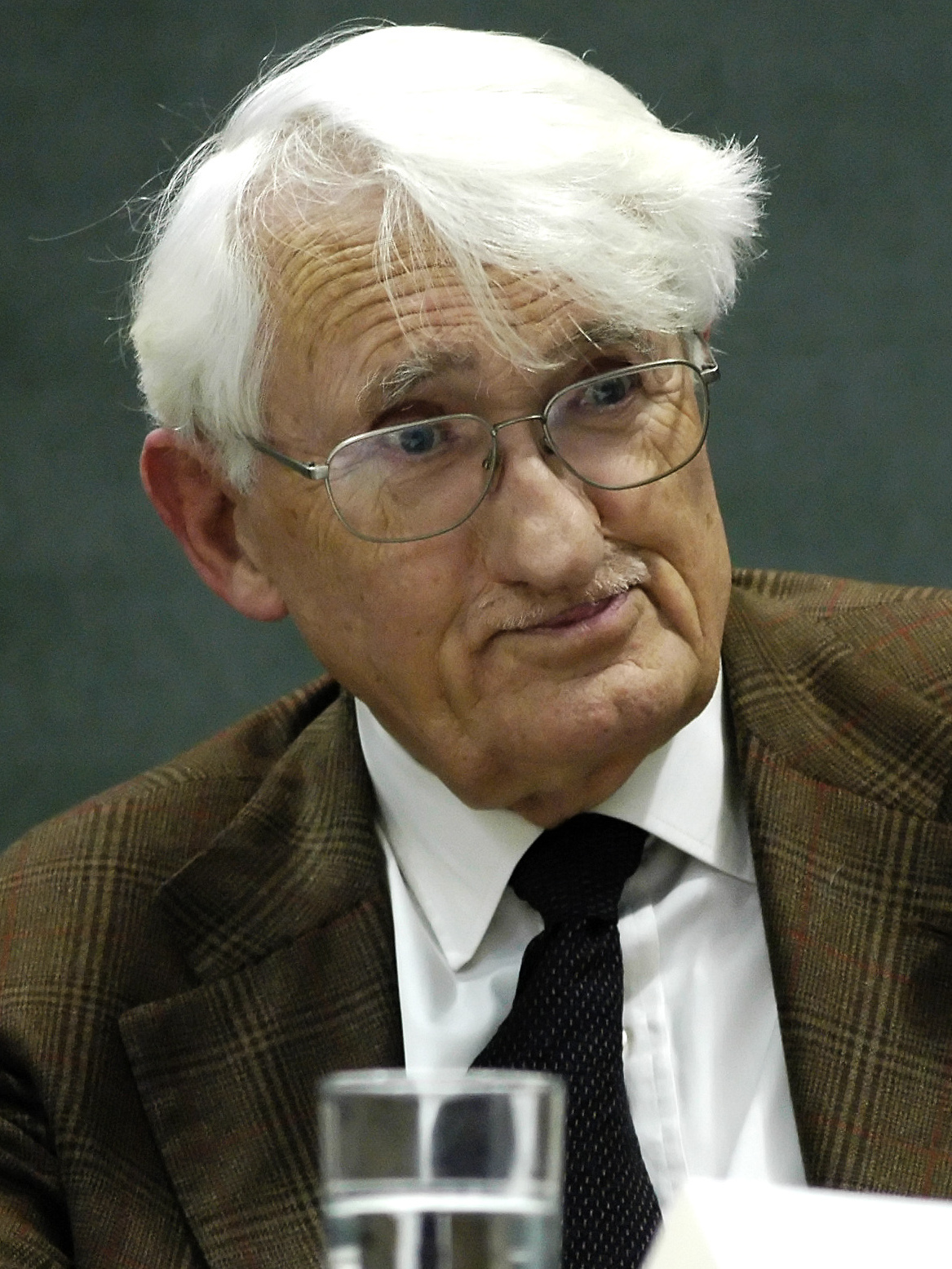
Philosopher Jürgen Habermas.

After 1750, states such as Britain and France invested in massive armies and navies which were so expensive to maintain that the option of hiring mercenary soldiers became less attractive. Rulers found troops within the public, and taxed the public to pay for these troops, but one account suggested that the military buildup had a side-effect of undermining the military's autonomous political power. Another view corroborates the idea that military conscription spurred development of a broader role for citizens.

A phenomenon known as the public sphere arose, according to philosopher Jürgen Habermas, as a space between authority and private life in which citizens could meet informally, exchange views on public matters, criticize government choices and suggest reforms. It happened in physical spaces such as public squares as well as in coffeehouses, museums, restaurants, as well as in media such as newspapers, journals, and dramatic performances. It served as a counterweight to government, a check on its power, since a bad ruling could be criticized by the public in places such as editorials. According to Schudson, the public sphere was a "playing field for citizenship".

=== Eastern conceptions ===
In the late-19th century, thinking about citizenship began to influence China. Discussion started of ideas (such as legal limits, definitions of monarchy and the state, parliaments and elections, an active press, public opinion) and of concepts (such as civic virtue, national unity, and social progress).

== Modern senses ==
=== Transitions ===
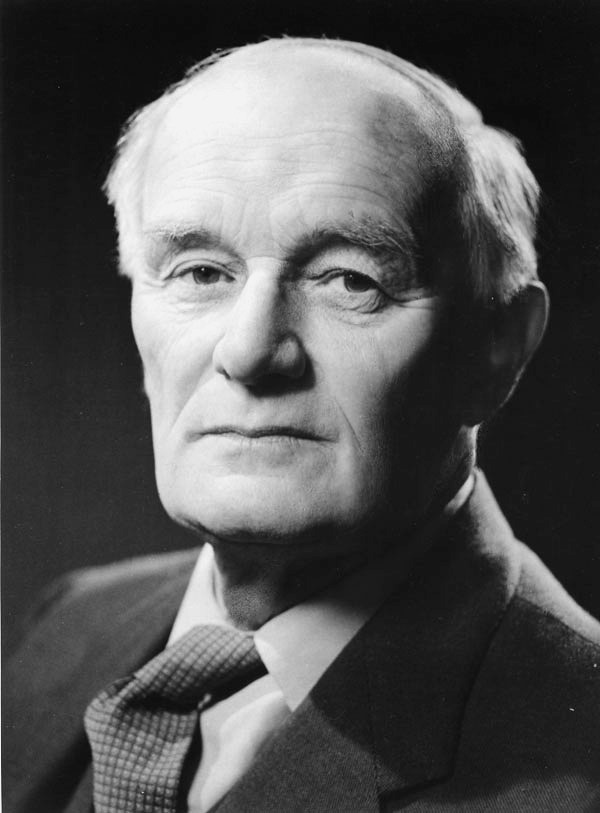
T. H. Marshall.

John Stuart Mill in his work On Liberty (1859) believed that there should be no distinctions between men and women, and that both were capable of citizenship. British sociologist Thomas Humphrey Marshall suggested that the changing patterns of citizenship were as follows: first, a civil relation in the sense of having equality before the law, followed by political citizenship in the sense of having the power to vote, and later a social citizenship in the sense of having the state support individual persons along the lines of a welfare state. Marshall argued in the middle of the 20th century that modern citizenship encompassed all three dimensions: civil, political, and social. He wrote that citizenship required a vital sense of community in the sense of a feeling of loyalty to a common civilization. Thinkers such as Marc Steinberg saw citizenship emerge from a class struggle interrelated with the principle of nationalism. People who were native-born or naturalised members of the state won a greater share of the rights out of "a continuing series of transactions between persons and agents of a given state in which each has enforceable rights and obligations", according to Steinberg. This give-and-take to a common acceptance of the powers of both the citizen and the state. He argued that:

The contingent and uneven development of a bundle of rights understood as citizenship in the early nineteenth century was heavily indebted to class conflict played out in struggles over state policy on trade and labor.

— Marc Steinberg, writing in 1996

Nationalism emerged. Many thinkers suggest that notions of citizenship rights emerged from this spirit of each person identifying strongly with the nation of their birth. A modern type of citizenship is one which lets people participate in a number of different ways. Citizenship is not a "be-all end-all" relation, but only one of many types of relationships which a person might have. It has been seen as an "equalizing principle" in the sense that most other people have the same status. One theory sees different types of citizenship emanating out from concentric circles—from the town, to the state, to the world—and that citizenship can be studied by looking at which types of relations people value at any one time.

The idea that participating in lawmaking is an essential aspect of citizenship continues to be expressed by different thinkers. For example, British journalist and pamphleteer William Cobbett said that the "greatest right", which he called the "right of rights", was having a share in the "making of the laws", and then submitting the laws to the "good of the whole."

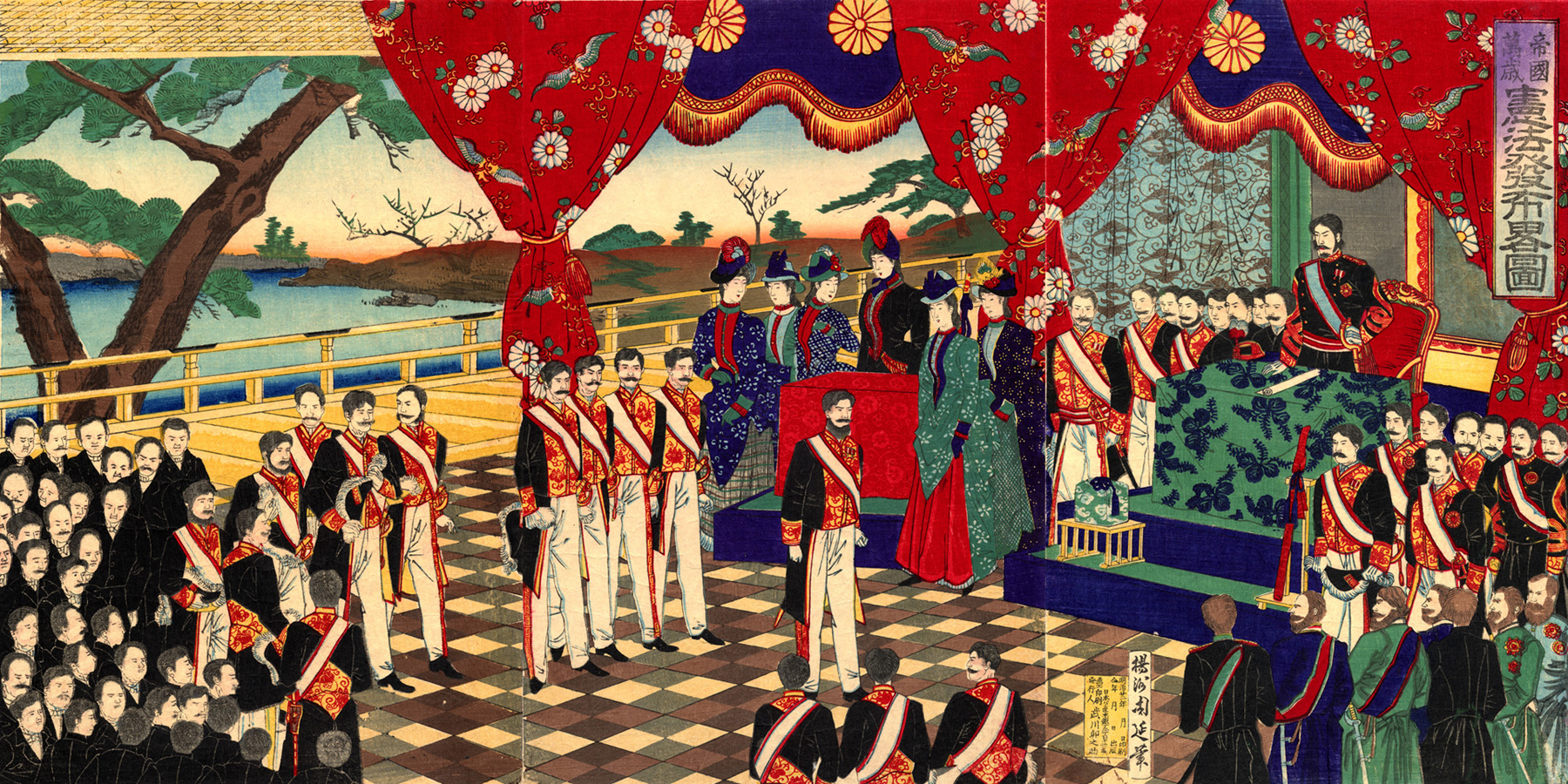
Social forces led to an "expanding democracy" in Meiji Japan. A painting by Toyohara Chikanobu showing the promulgation of the Meiji Constitution c. late 19th century.

The idea of citizenship, and western senses of government, began to emerge in Asia in the 19th and 20th centuries. In Meiji era Japan, popular social forces exerted influence against traditional types of authority, and out of a period of negotiations and concessions by the state came a time of "expanding democracy", according to one account. Numerous cause-and-effect relations worked to bring about a Japanese version of citizenship: expanding military activity led to an enlarged state and territory, which furthered direct rule including the power of the military and the Japanese emperor, but this indirectly led to popular resistance, struggle, bargaining, and consequently an expanded role for citizens in early 20th century Japan.

=== Citizenship today ===
The concept of citizenship is hard to isolate, since it relates to many other contextual aspects of society such as the family, military service, the individual, freedom, religion, ideas of right and wrong, ethnicity, and patterns for how a person should behave in society. According to British politician Douglas Hurd, citizenship is essentially doing good to others. When there are many different ethnic and religious groups within a nation, citizenship may be the only real bond which unites everybody as equals without discrimination—it is a "broad bond" as one writer described it. Citizenship links "a person with the state" and gives people a universal identity—as a legal member of a nation—besides their identity based on ties of ethnicity or an ethnic self.

But clearly there are wide differences between ancient conceptions of citizenship and modern ones. While the modern one still respects the idea of participation in the political process, it is usually done through "elaborate systems of political representation at a distance" such as representative democracy, and carried out under the "shadow of a permanent professional administrative apparatus." Unlike the ancient patterns, modern citizenship is much more passive; action is delegated to others; citizenship is often a constraint on acting, not an impetus to act. Nevertheless, citizens are aware of their obligations to authorities, and they are aware that these bonds "limits their personal political autonomy in a quite profound manner". But there are disagreements that the contrast between ancient and modern versions of citizenship was that sharp; one theorist suggested that the supposedly "modern" aspects of so-called passive citizenship, such as tolerance, respect for others, and simply "minding one's own business", were present in ancient times too.

Citizenship can be seen as both a status and an ideal. Sometimes mentioning the idea of citizenship implies a host of theories as well as the possibility of social reform, according to one view. It invokes a model of what a person should do in relation to the state, and suggests education or punishment for those who stray from the model.

Several thinkers see the modern notion of individualism as being sometimes consistent with citizenship, and other times opposed to it. Accordingly, the modern individual and the modern citizen seem to be the same, but too much individualism can have the effect of leading to a "crisis of citizenship". Another agreed that individualism can corrupt citizenship. Another sees citizenship as a substantial dilemma between the individual and society, and between the individual and the state, and asked questions such as whether the focus of a person's efforts should be on the collective good or on the individual good? In a Marxist view, the individual and the citizen were both "essentially necessary" to each other in that neither could exist without the other, but both aspects within a person were essentially antagonistic to each other. Habermas suggested in his book The Structural Transformation of the Public Sphere that while citizenship widened to include more people, the public sphere shrunk and became commercialized, devoid of serious debate, with media coverage of political campaigns having less focus on issues and more focus on sound bites and political scandals, and in the process, citizenship became more common but meant less. Political participation declined for most people.

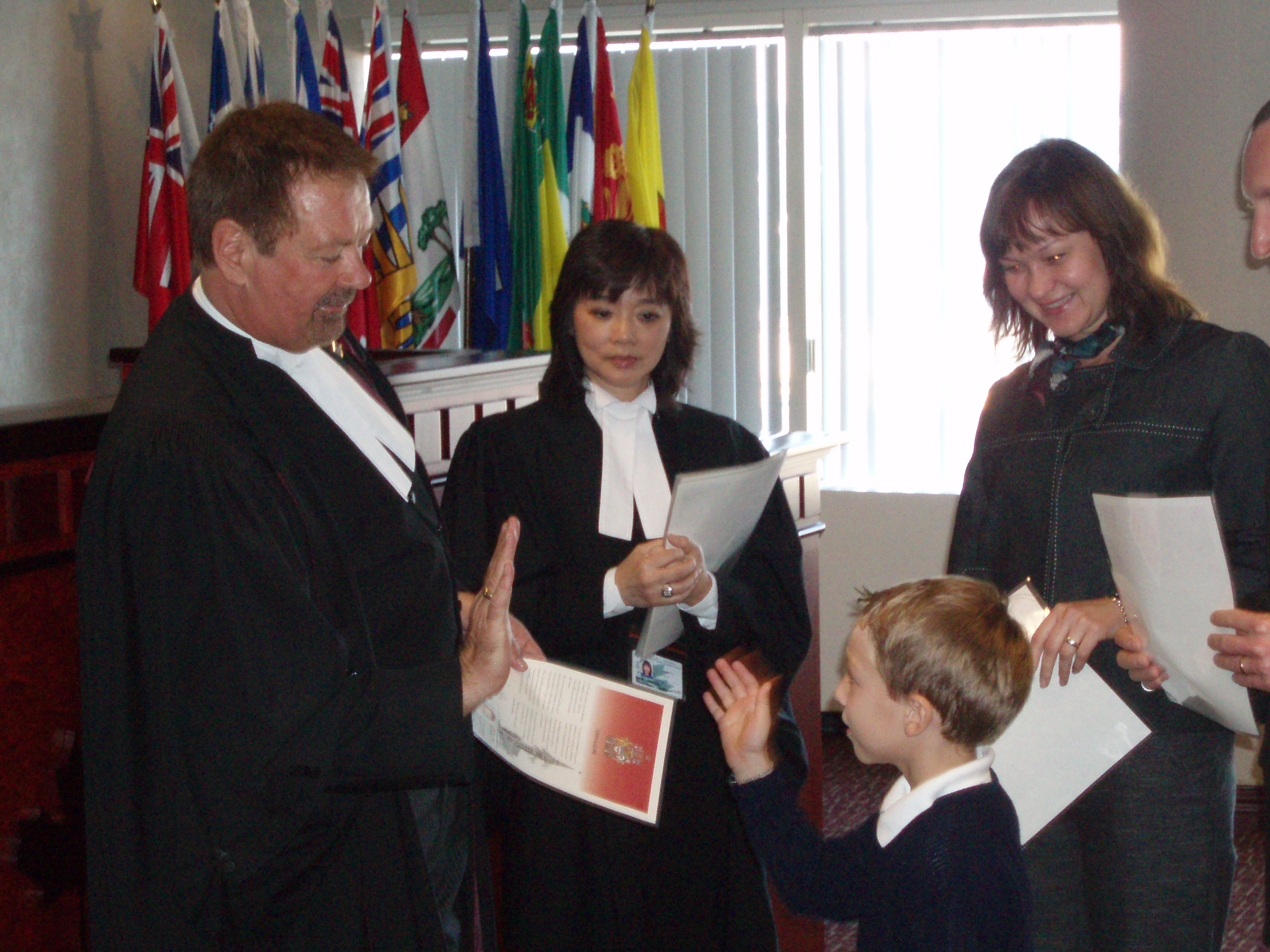
Oath of citizenship ceremony in Canada.

Other thinkers echo that citizenship is a vortex for competing ideas and currents, sometimes working against each other, sometimes working in harmony. For example, sociologist T. H. Marshall suggested that citizenship was a contradiction between the "formal political equality of the franchise" and the "persistence of extensive social and economic inequality." In Marshall's sense, citizenship was a way to straddle both issues. A wealthy person and a poor person were both equal in the sense of being citizens, but separated by the economic inequality. Marshall saw citizenship as the basis for awarding social rights, and he made a case that extending such rights would not jeopardize the structure of social classes or end inequality. He saw capitalism as a dynamic system with constant clashes between citizenship and social class, and how these clashes played out determined how a society's political and social life would manifest themselves.

Citizenship was not always about including everybody, but was also a powerful force to exclude persons at the margins of society, such as the outcasts, illegal immigrants and others. In this sense, citizenship was not only about getting rights and entitlements but it was a struggle to "reject claims of entitlement by those initially residing outside the core, and subsequently, of migrant and immigrant labour." But one thinker described democratic citizenship as inclusive, generally, and wrote that democratic citizenship:

... (democratic citizenship) extends human, political and civil rights to all inhabitants, regardless of race, religion, ethnicity, or culture. In a civic state, which is based on the concept of such citizenship, even foreigners are protected by the rule of law."

— Feliks Gross, 1999

=== Competing senses ===
Citizenship in the modern sense is often seen as having two widely divergent strains marked by tension between them.

==== Liberal-individualist view ====
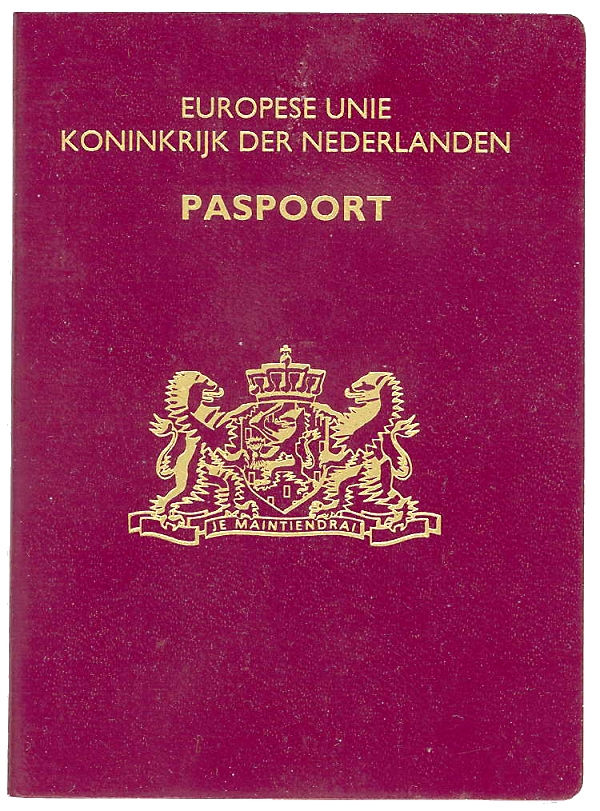
A Dutch passport. In modern times, passports are often used as proof of citizenship.

The liberal-individualist conception of citizenship, or sometimes merely the liberal conception, has a concern that the individual's status may be undermined by government. The perspective suggests a language of "needs" and "entitlements" necessary for human dignity and is based on reason for the pursuit of self-interest or more accurately as enlightened self-interest. The conception suggests a focus on the manufacture of material things as well as man's economic vitality, with society seen as a "market-based association of competitive individuals." From this view, citizens are sovereign, morally autonomous beings with duties to pay taxes, obey the law, engage in business transactions, and defend the nation if it comes under attack, but are essentially passive politically. This conception of citizenship has sometimes been termed conservative in the sense that passive citizens want to conserve their private interests, and that private people have a right to be left alone. This formulation of citizenship was expressed somewhat in the philosophy of John Rawls, who believed that every person in a society has an "equal right to a fully adequate scheme of equal basic rights and liberties" and that society has an obligation to try to benefit the "least advantaged members of society". But this sense of citizenship has been criticized; according to one view, it can lead to a "culture of subjects" with a "degeneration of public spirit" since economic man, or homo economicus, is too focused on material pursuits to engage in civic activity to be true citizens.

==== Civic-republican view ====
A competing vision is that democratic citizenship may be founded on a "culture of participation". This orientation has sometimes been termed the civic-republican or classical conception of citizenship since it focuses on the importance of people practicing citizenship actively and finding places to do this. Unlike the liberal-individualist conception, the civic-republican conception emphasizes man's political nature, and sees citizenship as an active, not passive, activity. A general problem with this conception, according to critics, is that if this model is implemented, it may bring about other issues such as the free rider problem in which some people neglect basic citizenship duties and consequently get a free ride supported by the citizenship efforts of others. This view emphasizes the democratic participation inherent in citizenship, and can "channel legitimate frustrations and grievances" and bring people together to focus on matters of common concern and lead to a politics of empowerment, according to theorist Dora Kostakopoulou. Like the liberal-individualist conception, it is concerned about government running roughshod over individuals, but unlike the liberal-individualist conception, it is relatively more concerned that government will interfere with popular places to practice citizenship in the public sphere, rather than take away or lessen particular citizenship rights. This sense of citizenship has been described as "active and public citizenship", and has sometimes been called a "revolutionary idea". According to one view, most people today live as citizens according to the liberal-individualist conception but wished they lived more according to the civic-republican ideal.

=== Other views ===
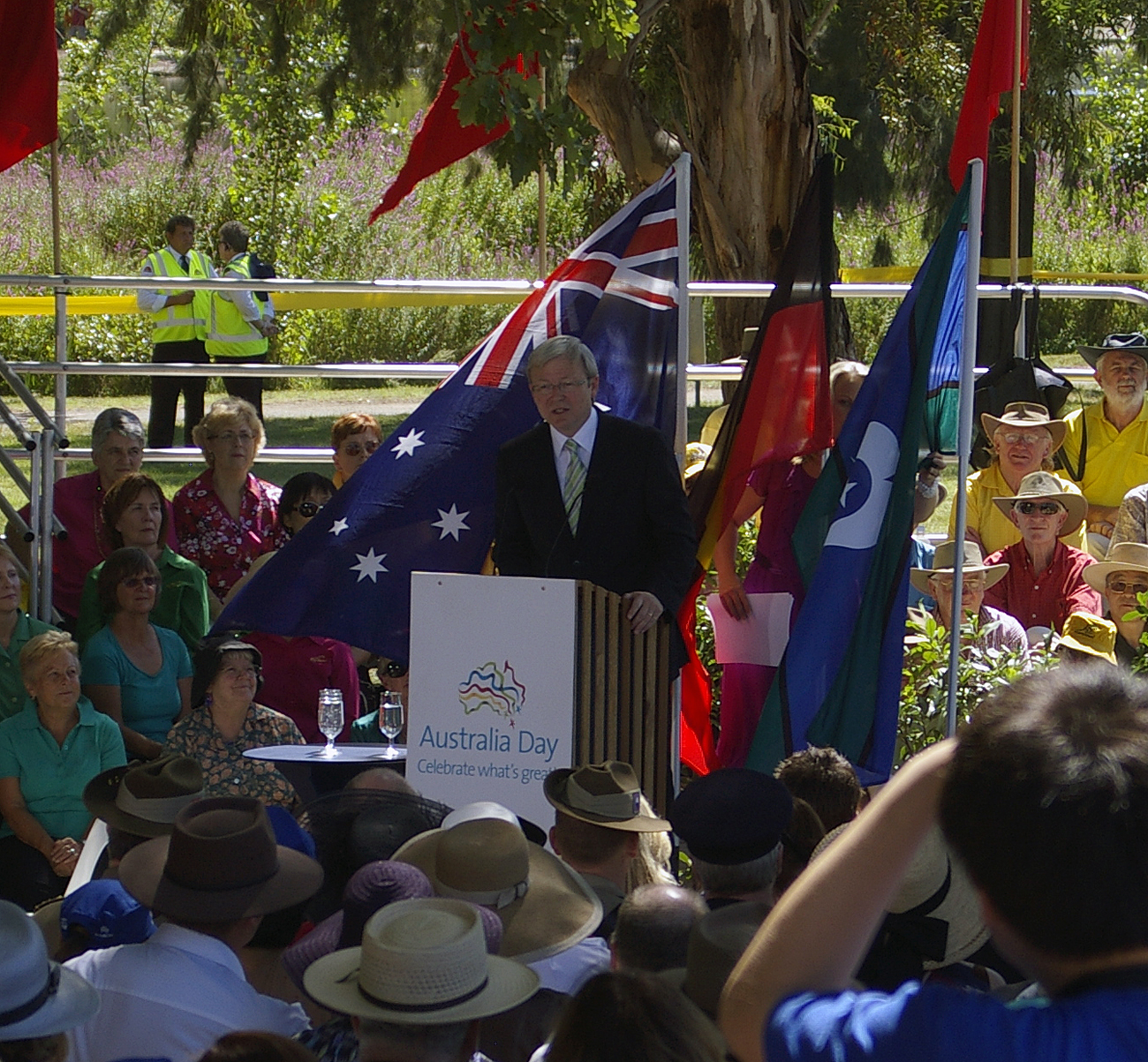
Australia holds citizenship ceremonies on Australia Day, the anniversary of the day Britain claimed sovereignty over Australia in 1788.

The subject of citizenship, including political discussions about what exactly the term describes, can be a battleground for ideological debates. In Canada, citizenship and related issues such as civic education are "hotly contested." There continues to be sentiment within the academic community that trying to define one "unitary theory of citizenship" which would describe citizenship in every society, or even in any one society, would be a meaningless exercise. Citizenship has been described as "multi-layered belongings"—different attachments, different bonds and allegiances. This is the view of Hebert & Wilkinson who suggest there is not one single perspective on citizenship but "multiple citizenship" relations since each person belongs to many different groups which define him or her.

Sociologist Michael Schudson examined changing patterns of citizenship in US history and suggested there were four basic periods:

1. The colonial era was marked by property-owning white males who delegated authority to "gentlemen", and almost all people did not participate as citizens according to his research. Early elections did not generate much interest, were characterized by low voter turnout, and rather reflected an existing social hierarchy. Representative assemblies "barely existed" in the 18th century, according to Schudson.
2. Political parties became prominent in the 19th century to win lucrative patronage jobs, and citizenship meant party loyalty.
3. The 20th century citizenship ideal was having an "informed voter", choosing rationally (ie voting) based on information from sources such as newspapers and books.
4. Citizenship came to be seen as a basis for rights and entitlements from government. Schudson predicted the emergence of what he called the monitorial citizen: persons engaged in watching for issues such as corruption and government violations of rights.

Schudson chronicled changing patterns in which citizenship expanded to include formerly disenfranchised groups such as women and minorities while parties declined. Interest groups influenced legislators directly via lobbying. Politics retreated to being a peripheral concern for citizens who were often described as "self-absorbed".

In the 21st-century America, citizenship is generally considered to be a legal marker recognizing that a person is an American. Duty is generally not part of citizenship. Citizens generally do not see themselves as having a duty to provide assistance to one another, although officeholders are seen as having a duty to the public. Rather, citizenship is a bundle of rights which includes being able to get assistance from the federal government. A similar pattern marks the idea of citizenship in many western-style nations. Most Americans do not think much about citizenship except perhaps when applying for a passport and traveling internationally. Feliks Gross sees 20th century America as an "efficient, pluralistic and civic system that extended equal rights to all citizens, irrespective of race, ethnicity and religion." According to Gross, the US can be considered as a "model of a modern civic and democratic state" although discrimination and prejudice still survive. The exception, of course, is that persons living within the borders of America illegally see citizenship as a major issue.

Nevertheless, one of the constants is that scholars and thinkers continue to agree that the concept of citizenship is hard to define, and lacks a precise meaning.

== See also ==
- Citizenship
- Citizenship in the United States
- Cosmopolitanism
- Global citizenship
- Transnational citizenship
