= Transnational citizenship =

Political concept

Transnational citizenship is a political concept which would redefine traditional notions of citizenship and replace an individual's singular national loyalties with the ability to belong to multiple nation states. Unlike national citizenship, where individuals interact in such capacities with one sovereign state, transnational citizenship transcends pre-established territorial boundaries to create a modern meaning of "belonging" in a globalized society. While preconceived notions of citizenship are often divided between national, social and individual forms of identity, all three categories serve to contribute to the meaning of transnational citizenship. State citizenship can be defined as an individual establishing their sense of belonging by espousing to the values of the state in the public sphere. When applied to transnational citizenship, an individual would have the opportunity to be civically engaged in multiple societies.

In terms of the categories of social and individual forms of belonging, transnational citizens are marked by multiple identities and allegiances, and often travel between two or more countries, all in which they have created sizeable networks of differing functions. Similar to global or cosmopolitan citizenship, it is composed of cross-national and multi-layered memberships to certain societies. Transnational citizenship is based on the idea that a new global framework consistent of subgroups of national identities will eventually replace membership to one nation-state. In a hyper-realized version of transnational citizenship, "states become intermediaries between the local and the global." Institutionalizing transnational citizenship would loosen ties between territories and citizenship and result in a reconstruction of the world order that changes the capacity in which individuals interact with government institutions.

== History and causes ==
While some relate transnational citizenship to any historic shift or fusion of identities within nation-states, modern conceptions of the term have only surfaced in the past twenty years. Many attribute the evolution of the term to the rising situation of globalization. Globalization is defined by a heightened international access to the world capital market system and increased abilities to more rapid forms of communication. Due to the convenience and ease of modern international exchanges, globalization has become the process by which international economies as well as individuals interact with one another. Since post-Cold War 1989, the evolved "global political economy" has resulted in massive "reconfigurations of the world's arenas". Globalization transformed a confined geo-political system into one that relies heavily on multiple levels of local, national and global interactions. For example, China's industrialization from an agricultural society to a manufacturing society chronicled by excessive imports and exports contribute to a need to interconnect societies from all corners of the globe. The wealth that private institutions experienced from globalization resulted in "further extensions of corporations in search of faraway resources and markets".

Beyond resulting in substantial political and economical shifts, globalization has also affected social and cultural practices between people. According to citizenship scholars like Andrew Vandenberg, such acts of globalization eventually "ended the constraints of space and time that conditioned all earlier human transactions, practices, and therefore identities. With the growth and distribution of technology, more people all over the world have come to establish personal relationships with one another. Former state-regulated formal encounters are now replaced by modern informal and all the more frequent interactions. Rapid world economic growth has consequently led to international migrations. In recent years, in conjunction with globalization, increased instances of uncontrolled and predominantly illegal international migrations contribute to opportunities for escalating transnational identities. Because obvious ties surface between immigrants, their home countries, and the receiving countries, the civic ramifications are widespread. Thus international immigration contributes to loosening individual state ties. Once in their host countries, immigrants form social networks while maintaining ties to their homeland. Some organizations function in both countries, which serves to further enhance the notion that international migrants act as transnational citizens in multiple lands.

== V. multiculturalism ==
It is important to draw a distinction between transnational citizenship and multiculturalism among national citizens. While transnational citizens bring cultural and societal elements of their home countries to their host countries and vice versa, multiculturalism results from the fusion of differing ethnic minorities or indigenous peoples on a micro scale of a particular local environment. These interactions are described as "crosscutting and always mutually situational identifications." Therefore, ethnic minorities and majorities alike intermingle in a mutually shared space. All different types of individuals function within the same system, and eventually collective national identities are formed. On the other hand, transnational citizens live within the context of two or more societies that differ in size, scope, populations, laws, morals, and cultural codes. While transnational citizens interact with those already present in each respective community, they are functioning within divergent spaces. They base their interactions more on the need to reconcile two completely diverse localities into a greater context that traverses international borders, politics, and ways of life.

== The European Union as a test case ==
"The question for the future of citizenship is whether a 'global' citizenship can transcend citizenships defined by 'local' stages on the basis of blood and birth through an act of the state itself." — Henry Teune

Some scholars consider the creation of the European Union as the pilot case for testing Teune's question about whether or not transnational citizenship can surpass national citizenship. Starting in the early 1980s, European national migration control officials met and established a consensus over the relationship between migration, asylum and crime. The control officials deemed migration as a security issue, and called for a "multi-level governance" in order to control migratory practices. Virginie Guiraudon generates the theory of "venue-shopping" in order to describe how cross-national policies prevailed. Venue-shopping is the process by which political members seek out specific governmental settings in order to establish their ideal policy outcomes. Political actors circumvented national levels of control in order to establish a "transnational cooperation" among nation-states. Starting in 1981, citizens with passports from European countries were able to move freely across borders into other European countries. Due to the increased ease of traversing borders, the "Europeanization" of individuals began to occur in which a new transnational identity could be conceived.

The creation of the European Union only accelerated growing notions of transnational citizenship across the continent. The European Union came into being on November 1, 1993, when European nations signed the Treaty of Maastricht into law. The treaty established "community policy" in six new areas, one of which is termed "trans-European networks." The treaty also discusses the specific effects of the merger on a new formation of European citizenship. The benefits of European citizenship include the ability for citizens to freely cross borders into and subsequently reside in other European countries, the right to vote in elections and run for office in both municipal and European elections in the state in which the citizen resides, the right to access any member country's diplomatic or consular services in a third-party country in which the citizen's birth nation is not represented, and the citizen's right to petition to the European Parliament. The treaty thus instituted "European citizenship over and above national citizenship". This ultimately facilitates a new form of "European identity" that allows for members of the European Union to function as transnational actors beyond their countries' borders, establishing the entire continent as one cohesive entity.

Finally, the creation of the euro serves as the pinnacle of Europe's newfound economic unification. On January 1, 1999, the euro replaced the pre-existing currency in 11 European countries. The Treaty of Maastricht also created the European System of Central Banks, which consists of the Central European Bank and national central banks working together to establish monetary policy across participating countries. Some scholars consider the act of unifying the currency as "culminating the progress toward economic and monetary union in Europe". While the aspect of monetary union is clear, the far-reaching effects of economic union between countries could be considered a cause for debate. Regardless, the euro allows for transnational citizens of the European Union to not only move freely across borders, but also to experience easier monetary exchanges through the ability to use a currency that is present in both the citizens' home and host countries. The political, economic, and social ramifications that result from the invention of the European Union help contribute to the construction of European citizens as the international model for transnational citizenship.

== See also ==
- History of citizenship
- Non-citizen suffrage
- Commonwealth citizen
- Citizenship of the Mercosur

== Sources ==
- Bauböck, Rainer (2003). "Towards a Political theory of migrant transnationalism" (PDF). The International Migration Review. 37 (3). New York: 700–723. doi:10.1111/j.1747-7379.2003.tb00155.x. JSTOR 30037754. S2CID 55880642.
- Chavez, Leo R. The Latino Threat: Constructing Immigrants, Citizens, and the Nation. Stanford University Press: 2008.
- Ciprut, Jose V., ed. The Future of Citizenship. MIT Press, Cambridge: 2008.
- Guiraudon, Virginie. "European Integration and Migration Policy: Vertical Policy-making as Venue Shopping." Journal of Common Market Studies, Vol. 38, No. 2., Blackwell Publishers, Lille, France: 2000.
- Jacobson, David. Rights Across Borders. Johns Hopkins University Press, Baltimore: 1996.
- Jackson, Robert. International Perspectives on Citizenship, Education, and Religious Diversity. Routeledge, London: 2003.
- Pollard, Patrick. "The Creation of the Euro and the Role of the Dollar in International Markets." The Federal Reserve Bank of St. Louis, 2001. 6 May 2010 .
- Soysal, Yasemin Nuhoglu. "Changing Citizenship in Europe: Remarks on postnational membership and the national state." University of Chicago Press: 1994.
- "Treaty of Maastricht on European Union." Activities of the European Union. Europa web portal. 6 May 2010.
- Waldinger, Roger. "Between Here and There: How Attached Are Latino Immigrants to Their Native Country?" Pew National Hispanic Center, 25 Oct. 2007. 4 May 2010.
- Vandenberg, Andrew, ed. Citizenship and Democracy in a Global Era. MacMillan Press, New York: 2000.
