= Earth Day 20 International Peace Climb =

The official logo of the Earth Day 20 International Peace Climb

The Earth Day 20 International Peace Climb was an expedition to reach the summit of Mount Everest during Earth Week 1990 led by Jim Whittaker, the first American to climb Mount Everest (in 1963), envisioned by Warren Thompson, and marked the first time in history that mountaineers from the United States, Soviet Union and China had roped together to climb a mountain, let alone Mount Everest.

The expedition's name was from its partnership with the Earth Day 20 Foundation, an organization celebrating the 20th anniversary of Earth Day that was led by Edward Furia. The climbers highlighted their expedition with a live satellite phone call to President George H. W. Bush as well as to Furia, Earth Day 20 organizers and thousands of supporters gathered in George, Washington, near the Columbia River on April 22, 1990. Whittaker called from base camp to pledge his support for world peace and attention to environmental issues.

The group also collected over two tons of trash (transported down the mountain by support groups along the way) that was left behind on Mount Everest from previous climbing expeditions.

== Summiters ==
- Summiters in May 1990, as led by Jim Whittaker
  - Robert Link
  - Steve Gall
  - Sergei Arsentiev
  - Grigori Lunyakov
  - Da Cheme
  - Gyal Bu
  - Ed Viesturs
  - Mistislav Gorbenko
  - Andrej Tselishchev
  - Ian Wade
  - Da Qiong
  - Luo Tse
  - Ren Na
  - Gui Sang
  - Yekaterina Ivanova
  - Anatoli Moshnikov
  - Yervand Ilyinski
  - Aleksandr Tokarev
  - Mark Tucker
  - Wang Ja
  - Warren Thompson

== See also ==
- List of Mount Everest expeditions
- List of 20th-century summiters of Mount Everest
- Earth Day
