= Earth Day =

Annual international event on April 22

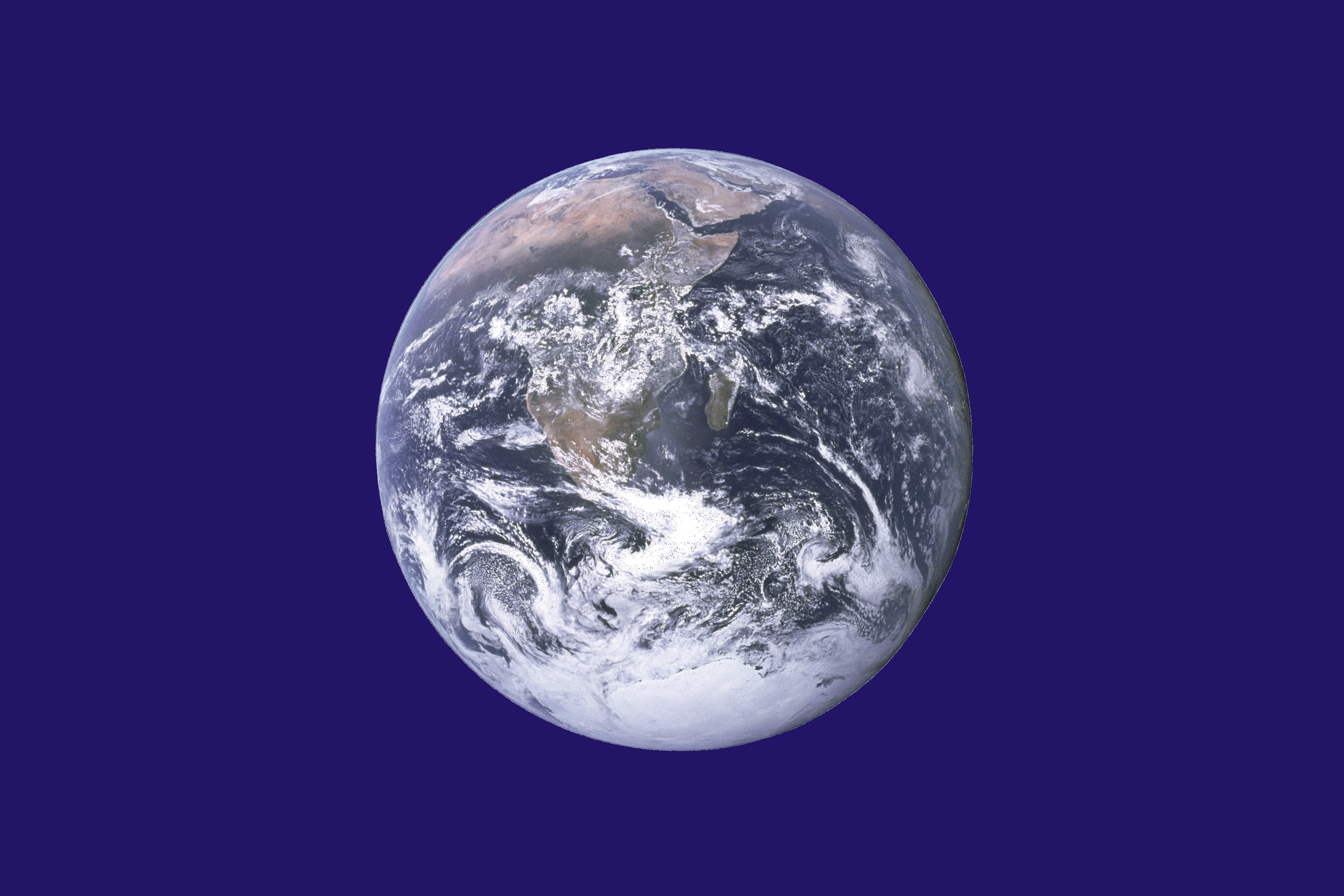
- The unofficial Earth Flag created by John McConnell includes The Blue Marble photograph taken by the crew of Apollo 17.
- Significance: Support for environmental protection
- Date: April 22
- Next time: April 22, 2027
- Frequency: Annual
- First time: 1970
- Related to: America Recycles Day, Creation Day, Greenery Day, International Mother Earth Day, World Environment Day, World Cleanup Day

Earth Day is an annual event on April 22 to demonstrate support for environmental protection. First held on April 22, 1970, it now includes a wide range of events coordinated globally through earthday.org (formerly Earth Day Network) including 1 billion people in more than 193 countries.

In 1969 at a UNESCO conference in San Francisco, the peace activist John McConnell proposed a day to honor the Earth and the concept of peace, to first be observed on March 21, 1970, the first day of spring in the northern hemisphere. This day of nature's equipoise was later sanctioned in a proclamation written by McConnell and signed by Secretary General U Thant at the United Nations. A month later, United States senator Gaylord Nelson proposed the idea to hold a nationwide environmental teach-in on April 22, 1970, and hired a young activist, Denis Hayes, to be the national coordinator. The name "Earth Day" was coined by the advertising writer Julian Koenig. Hayes and his staff grew the event beyond the original idea for a teach-in to include the entire United States.

Key non-environmentally focused partners played major roles. Under the leadership of the labor leader Walter Reuther, for example, the United Auto Workers (UAW) was the most instrumental outside financial and operational supporter of the first Earth Day. According to Hayes: "Without the UAW, the first Earth Day would have likely flopped!" Nelson was later awarded the Presidential Medal of Freedom award in recognition of his work.

The first Earth Day was focused on the United States. In 1990, Denis Hayes, the original national coordinator in 1970, took it international and organized events in 141 nations. On Earth Day 2016, the landmark Paris Agreement was signed by the United States, the United Kingdom, China, and 120 other countries. This signing satisfied a key requirement for the entry into force of the historic draft climate protection treaty adopted by consensus of the 195 nations present at the 2015 United Nations Climate Change Conference in Paris. Numerous communities engaged in "Earth Day Week actions," an entire week of activities focused on the environmental issues that the world faces. On Earth Day 2020, over 100 million people around the world observed the 50th anniversary of the event, now the world's largest civic observance.

== 1969 Santa Barbara oil spill ==
On January 28, 1969, a well called Platform A, drilled by Union Oil 6 miles (10 km) off the coast of Santa Barbara, California, blew out. More than 3 million U.S. gallons (2.5 million imperial gallons; 11 million liters) of oil spilled, killing more than 10,000 seabirds, dolphins, seals, and sea lions. As a reaction to this disaster, activists were mobilized to create environmental regulation, environmental education, and Earth Day. Among the proponents of Earth Day were the people in the front lines of fighting this disaster, Selma Rubin, Marc McGinnes, and Bud Bottoms, founder of Get Oil Out. Denis Hayes, organizer of the first Earth Day, said that Senator Gaylord Nelson from Wisconsin was inspired to create Earth Day upon seeing an 800-square-mile (2,100 km^{2}) oil slick from an airplane in the Santa Barbara Channel.

== Santa Barbara's Environmental Rights Day 1970 ==
On the first anniversary of the oil blowout, January 28, 1970, Environmental Rights Day was created, and the Declaration of Environmental Rights was read. It had been written by Rod Nash during a boat trip across the Santa Barbara Channel while carrying a copy of Thomas Jefferson's Declaration of Independence. The organizers of Environmental Rights Day, led by Marc McGinnes, had been working closely over a period of several months with Congressman Pete McCloskey (R-CA) to consult on the creation of the National Environmental Policy Act, the first of many new environmental protection laws sparked by the national outcry about the blowout/oil spill and on the Declaration of Environmental Rights. Both McCloskey (Earth Day co-chair with Senator Gaylord Nelson) and Earth Day organizer Denis Hayes, along with Senator Alan Cranston, Paul Ehrlich, David Brower and other prominent leaders, endorsed the Declaration and spoke about it at the Environmental Rights Day conference. According to Francis Sarguis, "the conference was sort of like the baptism for the movement." According to Hayes, this was the first giant crowd he spoke to that "felt passionately, I mean really passionately, about environmental issues." Hayes also thought the conference might be the beginning of a real movement. Nash, Garrett Hardin, McGinnes and others went on to develop the first undergraduate Environmental Studies program of its kind at the University of California at Santa Barbara.

== Earth Day 1970 ==
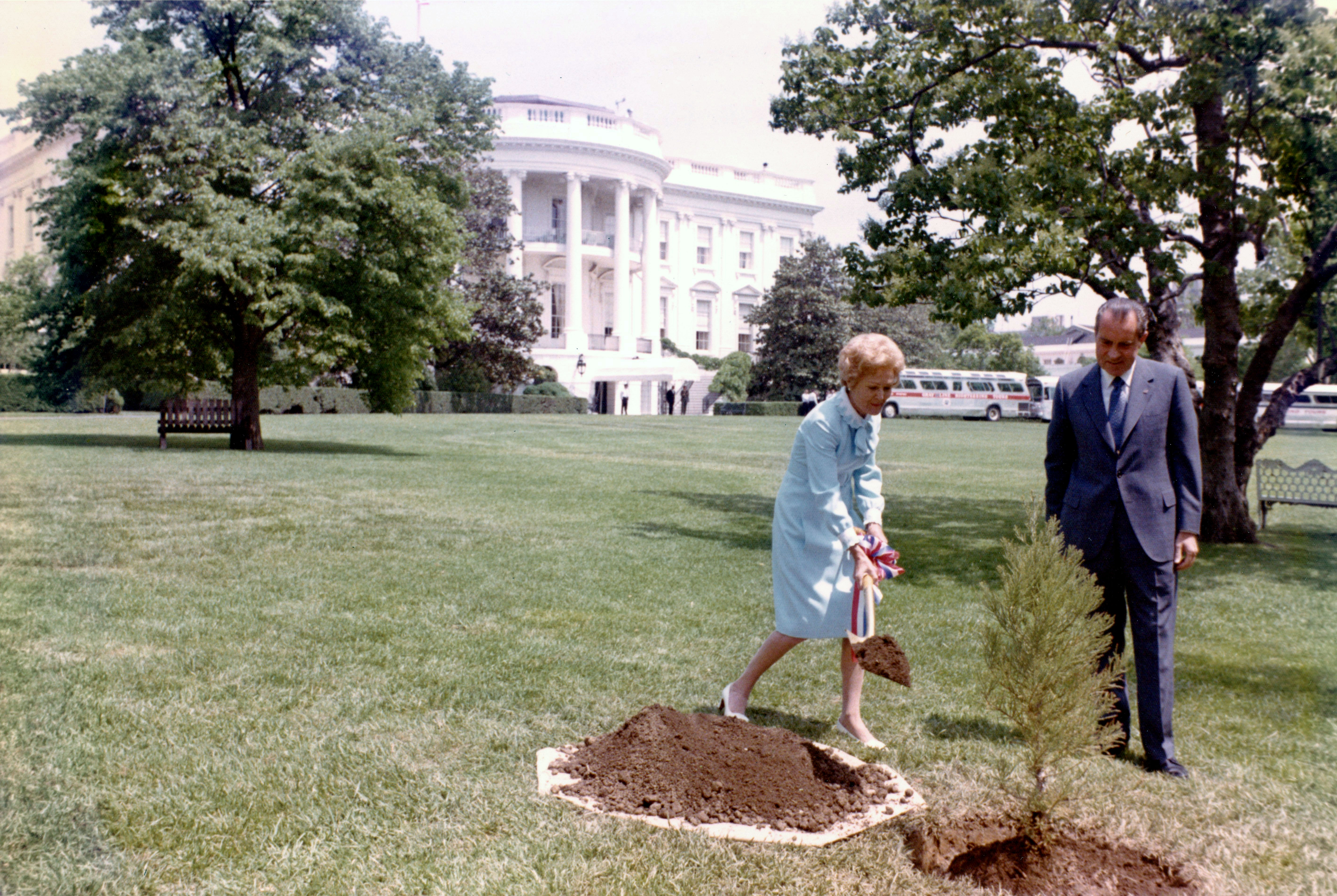
President Richard Nixon and First Lady Pat Nixon plant a tree on the White House South Lawn to recognize the first Earth Day.

The seeds that grew into the first Earth Day were planted by many people, including Wisconsin senator Gaylord Nelson. An ardent conservationist and former two-term governor of Wisconsin, Nelson had long sought ways to increase the potency of the environment as a political issue. The extraordinary attention garnered by Rachel Carson's 1962 book, Silent Spring, the famous 1968 Earthrise NASA photograph of the Earth from the Moon, the saturation news coverage given to the Santa Barbara oil spill and the Cuyahoga River catching fire in early 1969 led Nelson to think the time was ripe for an environmental initiative. As a result of interactions with his staff and with Fred Dutton, a prominent Democratic operative who had been Robert Kennedy's presidential campaign manager, Nelson became convinced that environmental teach-ins on college campuses could serve as such a vehicle.

Elsewhere in the US, discussions in higher education were also being held to seek ways to honor the Earth. In an oral history interview conducted May 10, 2024, Tucson, Arizona, based ethnobotanist Martha Ames Burgess (now a researcher at the Desert Laboratory) recounted a 1968 meeting of University of Arizona students and professors, including Ecology & Evolutionary Biology professor Stephen M. Russell. The meeting was held at Chiricahua National Monument to envision a celebration of the earth and its processes. The meeting ended with another nascent plan for Earth Day.

Teach-ins had been held on hundreds of college campuses to debate the war in Vietnam. They generally reflected the divide between those who thought of Vietnam as a bulwark to stop additional countries falling to communism like dominos, versus those who believed that the war was the latest stage of a nationalist, anti-colonialist campaign by Vietnamese who had fought against China, then France, Japan, France again, and now the United States. These debates elevated arguments over the war in the public consciousness and enlisted a generation of student activists.

Nelson asked public interest lawyer Anthony Roisman to establish a non-profit, Environmental Teach-In, Inc., to manage the campaign, and recruited a small board of directors. He asked Republican congressman Pete McCloskey to co-chair the board to ensure it was bipartisan and bicameral.

On September 20, 1969, Senator Nelson first announced his plans for an "environmental teach-In" in a little-publicized talk at the University of Washington. "I am convinced that the same concern the youth of this nation took in changing this nation's priorities on the war in Vietnam and on civil rights can be shown for the problem of the environment. That is why I plan to see to it that a national teach-in is held."

Senator Nelson went on to encourage teach-ins at many more speeches. A November talk at Airlie House had a New York Times reporter in the audience. The resulting front-page article was a turning point. Letters of inquiry from across the country began to pour into Nelson's Senate office. The article piqued the interest of Denis Hayes, then a graduate student at Harvard. Hayes traveled to Washington, D.C., and arranged a 10-minute visit with Senator Nelson (which stretched into two hours). Hayes returned to Harvard with the charter to organize Boston. After a few days of reference checks, he was asked to drop out of Harvard to become executive director of the national campaign.

Because of the non-hierarchical tenor of the times, Hayes suggested that people be designated coordinators rather than directors. He became the national coordinator, and he quickly hired various regional coordinators, a press coordinator, a K–12 coordinator, a volunteer coordinator, etc. At its peak, the national office had a few dozen paid staff, each earning a flat $375/month (equivalent to $3,292 in 2025), plus more than 100 regular volunteers.

As the talented regional coordinators fanned out across the country, however, they immediately encountered two problems. First, by 1970, the concept of "teach-ins" had become passé. Moreover, teach-ins generally involved debates, and no one was pro-pollution. Second, and more troubling, leading activists on college campuses were deeply involved in the anti-war and civil rights movements. They tended to view the environment as a distraction.

=== The "Earth Day" name ===
The solution to the first problem came from an unexpected direction. Shortly after the turn of the year, Julian Koenig stopped by the national offices and volunteered to help. Koenig was a Madison Avenue giant. His campaign for Volkswagen, "Think Small," was later cited by Advertising Age as the "greatest advertising campaign of the 20th century."

Over coffee, Hayes confided that the "teach-in" moniker was not working and asked whether Koenig had any ideas. Koenig asked for a few days. A week later, he returned with an assortment of mock-ups for ads, laid out around the announcement of "Ecology Day," "Environment Day," "Earth Day," and "E Day." Koenig said that his personal favorite was Earth Day – in part because April 22 happened to be his birthday, and "birthday" rhymes with "Earth Day." Hayes immediately agreed. Koenig offered to prepare a fully refined ad. Hayes insisted that it include a small coupon soliciting funds for the threadbare operation. Koenig's ad was visually arresting, and perfectly summed up the issues and values, the feisty-but-welcoming tone that the campaign had adopted. Hayes loved it and decided to bet the farm. He committed about half of all the money in the campaign's bank account to buy a full page in The Sunday New York Times opinion section.

The ad was a huge success. Overnight, "Earth Day" became the almost-universally-used name for the upcoming event. The ad generated more than enough revenue to repay its cost, and thousands of potential organizers sent in their names and addresses along with their checks. In future months, magazines and alternative newspapers ran the ad for free, generating still more names and more financial support. The national office started using Environmental Action, rather than Environmental Teach-in, on its letterhead and publications to promote Earth Day.

At this point, Hayes made a far-reaching decision. In those early days, it would have been easy to obtain trademark protection for Earth Day and force compliance with a set of standards by anyone using it. Hayes decided, however, that he wanted the name to be broadly used by anyone who planned to focus on environmental issues that spring.

Bryce Hamilton, who had been Midwest coordinator, was shifted to K–12 coordinator, and it proved to be a great choice. Hamilton reached out to the National Education Association, American Federation of Teachers, and the National Science Teachers Association to enlist their members; he provided materials to thousands of educators who wrote to the group directly; and he distributed the most creative ideas he received from anyone to everyone else. In April, more than 10,000 primary and secondary schools engaged in Earth Day activities, mostly education and service actions like beach clean-ups, tree planting, and recycling.

Walt Kelly created an anti-pollution poster featuring his comic strip character Pogo with the quotation "We have met the enemy and he is us" to promote the 1970 Earth Day. Environmental groups have sought to make Earth Day into a day of action to change human behavior and provoke policy changes.

On the first Earth Day an estimated 20 million Americans took part in rallies, marches, and teach-ins calling for environmental reform. Earth Day is now observed in 192 countries, and coordinated by the nonprofit Earthday.org (formerly Earth Day Network). According to Denis Hayes, the first Earth Day 1970 organizer and current Board Chair Emeritus of Earthday.org, Earth Day is now "the largest secular day of protest in the world, and more than a billion people participate in Earth Day actions every year."

By far the largest source of funding for the first Earth Day was organized labor. Walter Reuther, president of the United Auto Workers (UAW) from 1946 until his death in 1970, made the first donation to support the first Earth Day in the amount of $2,000 (equivalent to $16,581 in 2025). Under his leadership, the UAW also funded telephone capabilities so that the organizers could communicate and coordinate with each other from all across the United States. The UAW also financed, printed, and mailed all of the literature and other materials for the first Earth Day and mobilized its members to participate in the public demonstrations across the country. According to Denis Hayes, "The UAW was by far the largest contributor to the first Earth Day" and "Without the UAW, the first Earth Day would have likely flopped!" Hayes further said, "Walter's presence at our first press conference utterly changed the dynamics of the coverage—we had instant credibility."

=== The Dirty Dozen ===
The staff of Environmental Teach-In resigned immediately after Earth Day, and most moved directly to a new organization, Environmental Action, with a tax status that permitted lobbying and a more activist stance. EA immediately confronted a problem that had been looming in the background throughout the campaign. Some of the staff had been drawn to the movement through science and culture and felt that politics was inherently dirty, and government was irredeemably compromised. This group believed that by living lives of voluntary simplicity, employing tools like those that filled the resolutely-nonpolitical Whole Earth Catalog, they could force the world to adapt to them. Their theory of change was modeled loosely on the southern African Americans who sat at segregated lunch counters, drank from segregated lunch counters, and sat in the back of the bus, it ignored the role of strategic litigation federal legislation, and electoral politics in cementing lasting change.

To square the circle, Hayes proposed that the group not endorse any candidates but that it try to defeat 12 of the worst. If having a terrible environmental record became a political liability, it would inevitably lead to better environmental legislation. Haft was selected to coordinate the Dirty Dozen campaign. With just $50,000 to defeat 12 incumbent members of the House, the odds were long.

To improve the odds, the group selected candidates who not only had lousy environmental records—which were plentiful—but who also had won their most recent race by a narrow margin; who were on the wrong side of an important environmental issue in their districts; and who lived in areas where talented Earth Day organizers resided. In the end, seven of the original Dirty Dozen were defeated—five Republicans and two Democrats. And the first to fall was George Fallon, chairman of the hugely powerful House Public Works Committee.

Representative Pete McCloskey, Earth Day co-chair, credits the Dirty Dozen's defeat of key congressional leaders with the unstoppable wave of environmental legislation that immediately followed: the Clean Air Act, Clean Water Act, Endangered Species Act, and others.

=== The University of Michigan teach-in ===
One place where the interest in a teach-in was robust from the beginning was the University of Michigan. The first teach-in on the Vietnam War had been held at the University of Michigan in March 1965, and a group of students, led by Doug Scott, decided to mark the five-year anniversary with an environmental teach-in on March 11–14, 1970.

=== The focus on pollution ===
The solution was to promote an overarching concern with air and water pollution, which affected everyone, while encouraging each community to pay attention to whatever other issues were of most concern to it. Earth Day included events that focused on fighting freeways, protecting the ozone layer, organic food, whales and endangered species, oil spills, the military use of Agent Orange in Vietnam, overpopulation, peeling lead paint in ghetto housing, opposition to the supersonic transport, and myriad other topics. At one event, college students would pound an automobile apart with sledgehammers, or, wearing gas masks, would block traffic on a freeway. At other events, grade-school students would plant trees, pick up litter in city parks, or identify birds. Earth Day welcomed them all.

Regional coordinators focused heavily on finding and enlisting the best local leadership in major metropolitan areas. For instance, Hayes flew to Chicago to help organize a subtle coup, replacing a pro-business Earth Day organization with a Saul Alinsky affiliated group called Campaign Against Pollution. CAP abruptly shifted the focus away from recycling to focus on two issues: opposition to a massive proposed freeway program, the Crosstown Expressway, and protesting the uncontrolled air pollution Commonwealth Edison was pouring into Chicago's air—more sulfur pollution than all other companies combined. Although mailings went out to thousands of communities of all sizes, the campaign focused especially hard on large cities.

=== New York City ===
In the winter of 1969–1970, a group of students met at Columbia University to hear Denis Hayes talk about his plans for Earth Day. Among the group were Fred Kent, Pete Grannis, and Kristin and William Hubbard. This group agreed to head up the New York City activities within the national movement. Fred Kent took the lead in renting an office and recruiting volunteers. The liberal Republican mayor of New York, John Lindsay, saw the environment as an issue that could help unite his then-troubled city. Moreover, he viewed the environment as a progressive wedge issue that would position him as clearly distinct from President Nixon's ultra-conservative "Southern Strategy," in a struggle for the soul of the Republican Party. He became fully engaged in supporting the event, and he delegated many of the talented young staff who had been drawn to his administration to help as well.

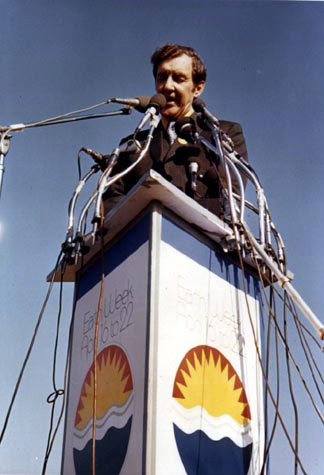
U.S. senator Edmund Muskie speaking at Fairmount Park, Philadelphia on Earth Day, 1970

"The big break came when Mayor Lindsay agreed to shut down Fifth Avenue for the event. A giant cheer went up in the office on that day," according to Kristin Hubbard (now Kristin Alexandre). "From that time on we used Mayor Lindsay's offices and even his staff. I was Speaker Coordinator but had tremendous help from Lindsay staffer Judith Crichton." Mayor Lindsay completely closed down Fifth Avenue to traffic from E. 14th Street to West 59th Street (Central Park)—more than 2 miles—and 14th Street between 3rd and 7th Avenues.

In addition to shutting down Fifth Avenue, Mayor John Lindsay made Central Park available for Earth Day. In Union Square, the New York Times estimated crowds of up to 20,000 people at any given time and, perhaps, more than 100,000 over the course of the day. Since Manhattan was also the home of NBC, CBS, ABC, The New York Times, Time, and Newsweek, it provided the best possible anchor for national coverage from their reporters throughout the country.

=== Philadelphia ===
U.S. senator Edmund Muskie was the keynote speaker on Earth Day in Fairmount Park in Philadelphia. Other notable attendees included consumer protection activist and presidential candidate Ralph Nader, landscape architect Ian McHarg, Nobel prize-winning Harvard biochemist George Wald, U.S. Senate Minority Leader Hugh Scott, poet Allen Ginsberg. and Ira Einhorn who acted as master of ceremonies.

== Earth Day 1980 ==
The 1970s were a period of substantial environmental legislation, including the Clean Air Act, Clean Water Act, Endangered Species Act, Marine Mammal Protection Act, Superfund, Toxics Substances Control Act, and the Resource Conservation and Recovery Act. It had seen the creation of the Environmental Protection Agency and the banning of DDT and of lead in gasoline. Jimmy Carter was president.

The 1980 Earth Day effort was led by Mike McCabe and Byron Kennard, and the general mood was festive and celebratory. The principal Washington, D.C., event was a festival held in Lafayette Park, across the street from the White House.

== Earth Day 1990 to 1999 ==
Mobilizing 200 million people in 141 countries and lifting the status of environmental issues onto the world stage, Earth Day activities in 1990 gave a huge boost to recycling efforts worldwide and helped pave the way for the 1992 United Nations Earth Summit in Rio de Janeiro. Unlike the first Earth Day in 1970, this 20th Anniversary was waged with stronger marketing tools, greater access to television and radio, and multimillion-dollar budgets.

The official logo of the Mount Everest Earth Day 20 International Peace Climb

Two separate groups formed to sponsor Earth Day events in 1990: The Earth Day 20 Foundation, assembled by Edward Furia (Project Director of Earth Week in 1970), and Earth Day 1990, assembled by Denis Hayes (National Coordinator for Earth Day 1970). Senator Gaylord Nelson, the original founder of Earth Day, was honorary chairman for both groups. The two did not combine forces over disagreements about leadership of combined organization and incompatible structures and strategies. Among the disagreements, key Earth Day 20 Foundation organizers were critical of Earth Day 1990 for including on their board Hewlett-Packard, a company that at the time was the second-biggest emitter of chlorofluorocarbons in Silicon Valley and refused to switch to alternative solvents. In terms of marketing, Earth Day 20 had a grassroots approach to organizing and relied largely on locally based groups like the National Toxics Campaign, a Boston-based coalition of 1,000 local groups concerned with industrial pollution. Earth Day 1990 employed strategies including focus group testing, direct mail fundraising, and email marketing.

The Earth Day 20 Foundation highlighted its April 22 activities in George, Washington, near the Columbia River with a live satellite phone call with members of the historic Earth Day 20 International Peace Climb who called from their base camp on Mount Everest to pledge their support for world peace and attention to environmental issues. The Earth Day 20 International Peace Climb was led by Jim Whittaker, the first American to summit Mt. Everest (many years earlier), and marked the first time in history that mountaineers from the United States, Soviet Union, and China had roped together to climb a mountain, let alone Mt. Everest. The group also collected more than two tons of trash (transported down the mountain by support groups along the way) that was left behind on Mount Everest from previous climbing expeditions. The master of ceremonies for the Columbia Gorge event was the TV star, John Ratzenberger, from Cheers, and the headlining musician was the "Father of Rock and Roll", Chuck Berry.

Warner Bros. Records released an Earth Day-themed single in 1990 entitled "Tomorrow's World", written by Kix Brooks (who would later become one-half of Brooks & Dunn) and Pam Tillis. The song featured vocals from Lynn Anderson, Butch Baker, Shane Barmby, Billy Hill, Suzy Bogguss, Kix Brooks, T. Graham Brown, The Burch Sisters, Holly Dunn, Foster & Lloyd, Vince Gill, William Lee Golden, Highway 101, Shelby Lynne, Johnny Rodriguez, Dan Seals, Les Taylor, Pam Tillis, Mac Wiseman, and Kevin Welch. It charted at number 74 on the Hot Country Songs chart dated May 5, 1990.

== Earth Day 2000–2019 ==
=== Earth Day 2000 ===
The first Earth Day of the new millennium had a focus on global warming and clean energy. This Earth Day made use of the Internet to help activists communicate. It involved participation from 5,000 environmental groups and activism was done in 184 countries.

=== Earth Day 2001 ===
Google's first Earth Day doodle was in 2001.

=== Earth Day 2003 ===
The theme for Earth Day 2003 was the Water for Life Campaign. This year, Earth Day Network developed a water quality project called "What's in Your Water?" Water-related events were held on every continent, including water workshops, exhibitions, concerts, and more in Togo, Egypt, the Cook Islands, Jordan, Palestine, Japan, Venezuela, Slovenia, Nigeria, and Canada. Educational curricula, teacher's guides, water testing kits, and posters focused on water.

Campaign for Communities, an initiative led by NAACP, Latino organizations including Southwest Voter Registration and Education Project, and other organizations focused on environmental justice, created events focused on low-income communities around the U.S. These events were also focused on building support among low-income communities through clean-ups, park revitalization, and town halls focused on integrating the environmental movement with community and social justice causes.

=== Earth Day 2004 ===
In the U.S. in 2004, Earth Day Network and its partners focused on voter registration for Earth Day, registering hundreds of thousands of voters. Major tree planting events also took place. Other prominent U.S. Earth Day events included an annual cleanup in Dayton, Ohio and the 3rd Annual Community Based Solutions to Environmental Health & Justice Conference in Seattle, Washington.

=== Earth Day 2005 ===
The theme for Earth Day 2005 was Healthy Environments for Children.

=== Earth Day 2006 ===
Earth Day 2006 focused on science and faith. Earth Day expanded into Europe for Earth Day 2006, and events and speeches were held in most of the EU countries. Key events included the "Festival on Climate Change" in Utrecht, the Netherlands, which was focused on "How to break away from the oil dependence," and included Earth Day founder Denis Hayes and members of the Dutch and E.U. parliament, NGOs, local authorities, and media representatives. In the first of two years of Earth Day events in Ukraine, Denis Hayes also attended and spoke at the "Chernobyl 20 Remembrance for the Future" conference in Kyiv, Ukraine. 2006 also saw events in China organized between Earth Day Network and Global Village Beijing educating communities about energy savings, the first-ever coordinated Earth Day events in Moscow, Russia, a scientific panel and a religious response panel on climate change throughout the U.S., and a "Conserve Your Energy" event in Philadelphia.

=== Earth Day 2007 ===
Thousands of Earth Day projects were held across the globe that ranged from energy efficiency events, protests, letter writing campaigns, civic and environmental K–12 education trainings, urban and rural cleanups, and water projects with a particular focus on building a broader and more diverse environmental movement.

In the US, civil rights, religious, and social justice leaders joined Earth Day Network the week of April 16 through April 20 to demand Congress on behalf of their communities and their constituencies that there be no "grandfathering" of pollution permits, that an immediate reduction in carbon emissions be imposed through legislation and that all revenues generated from a carbon tax or a government auction of carbon permits be used for public benefit. Earth Day Network partnered with Green Apple Music & Arts Festival to mark Earth Day with weekend-long events featuring music and entertainment in New York, San Francisco, and Chicago. More than 200,000 people attended the events and millions of people were reached through the media.

The Global Warming in the Pulpit Pledge campaign which mobilized priests, ministers, rabbis, and other faith leaders across the U.S. and Canada to make a commitment to preach on global climate change as a moral issue was launched.

=== Earth Day 2008 ===
Earth Day 2008 galvanized millions of people around the world in a Call For Climate. In the U.S., the campaign challenged the public to make one million calls to Congress about pushing for climate change legislation. 2008 also included large climate rallies in eight major U.S. cities, including Washington, D.C., New York, Miami, Chicago, Dallas, Denver, Los Angeles, and San Francisco, to which around 350,000 people attended. Washington, D.C., hosted actor Edward Norton, Thomas Friedman of the New York Times, and James Hansen of NASA to deliver a strong global warming message and call for tough and fair climate action by Congress. O.A.R., Umphrey's McGee, Warren Haynes, Mambo Sauce, and Blake Lewis of American Idol entertained enthusiastic crowds, and the event was covered live by CNN and The Weather Channel, plus scores of other media that carried the Call for Climate message. Many Earth Day events were held around the world from the Earth Day on Campus campaign.

=== Earth Day 2009 ===
The 2009 National Teach-In on Global Warming Solutions reached college campuses, civic organizations, and faith groups across the U.S. As part of this event, members of Congress addressed college and high school campuses in their districts via video conference.

=== Earth Day 2010 (40th anniversary) ===
An estimated one billion people around the world took action for the 40th anniversary of Earth Day. An estimated 20,000 partners took action on climate change and other environmental issues through climate rallies, Billion Acts of Green™, and by engaging civil leaders in plans to build a green economy, connected through the online action center at Earthday.org. Through the Global Day of Conversation, more than 200 elected officials in more than 39 countries took part in active dialogues with their constituents about their efforts to create sustainable green economies and reduce their carbon footprints. Students around the world participated in school greenings, featuring community clean-ups, solar energy systems, school gardens, and environmental curriculum. Earth Day Network announced a partnership with Twentieth Century Fox Home Entertainment's Avatar Home Tree Initiative to plant one million trees in 15 countries by the end of 2010.

The Climate Rally on the National Mall in Washington, D.C., drew in more than 150,000 activists to demand that U.S. Congress pass comprehensive climate legislation in 2010.

In partnership with the Peace Corps, Earth Day Network worked with local volunteers to implement environmental and civic education programs, tree plantings, village clean-ups, and recycling seminars in rural areas in Ukraine, the Philippines, Georgia, Albania, and Kolkata, India.

As part of a nationwide commemoration of the 40th anniversary in Morocco, the government announced a unique National Charter for the Environment and Sustainable Development, the first commitment of its kind in Africa and the Arab world, which will inform new environmental laws for the country. The Kingdom of Morocco also pledged to plant one million trees.

Internationally, a new episode from season 7 of SpongeBob SquarePants aired, by the name of "SpongeBob's Last Stand".

=== Earth Day 2011 ===
2011 Earth Day events included an environmental forum for local political leaders and the first-ever Earth Day celebration in Tunis City and primary school events throughout Iraq. In 17 of the world's most severely deforested countries, Earth Day Network completed a project to plant over 1.1 million trees. Across the globe, more than 100 million Billion Acts of Green were registered. In September 2011, at the Clinton Global Initiative, President Clinton recognized this project as an exemplary approach to addressing global challenges.

=== Earth Day 2012 ===
A Billion Acts of Green were achieved on Earth Day 2012, with Earth Day Network announcing the accomplishment at the United Nations Conference on Sustainable Development in Rio. A Billion Acts of Green is billed as the world's largest environmental service campaign, inspiring and rewarding both simple individual acts and larger organizational initiatives that further the goal of measurably reducing carbon emissions and supporting sustainability. The Campaign for Communities engaged elected officials in finding solutions to local environmental challenges. Faith programs saw Catholic parishes and churches across the U.S. take action on Earth Day through sermons and other activities, including four events at the National Cathedral and a conference at the St. Sophia Cathedral and National Religious Coalition on Creation Care (NRCC). Mobilize the Earth™ events throughout all of India's states and geographic regions, coordinated by Earth Day Network India, included rallies, concerts, competitions, seminars, art shows, plantation drives, signature campaigns, and workshops.

=== Earth Day 2013 ===
The goal of Earth Day 2013 was to personalize the massive challenge that climate change presents while uniting people around the globe into a powerful call to action with the theme: The Face of Climate Change. To illustrate that climate change is not a remote problem for our leaders but is impacting real people, animals, and places everywhere, EDN collected images sent into #faceofclimate and displayed them in a collage at thousands of events around the world from schools to parks to government buildings. High level organizations and individuals participated in the campaign, including the Secretary General of the Organization of American States, US Secretary of State, and many more.

Meanwhile, stories of hope inspired communities to take action and MobilizeU, a program to educate and activate college students around Earth Day and environmental issues, expanded in 2013 to 296 universities in 51 countries on six continents and in 46 US states.

In Washington, D.C., EDN presented Earth Month at Union Station, a four-week series of events that featured an environmental film festival, renewable energy demonstrations, farmers markets, NASA educational exhibits, and public talks by scientists and astronauts. In partnership with Washington, D.C. Public Schools, EDN also presented a STEM Fair at Union Station.

=== Earth Day 2014 ===
The goal of Earth Day 2014 was to dramatically personalize the massive challenges surrounding global climate change and weave that into both Earth Day 2014 and the five-year countdown to Earth Day 2020, the 50th anniversary. It was an opportunity to unite people worldwide into a common cause and call for action.

The theme of Earth Day 2014 was Green Cities.

=== Earth Day 2015 ===
To recognize the 45th anniversary of Earth Day, the 2015 global theme was termed "It's Our Turn to Lead."

EDN hosted Global Citizen 2015 Earth Day,

=== Earth Day 2016 ===
The theme for Earth Day 2016 was Trees for Earth.

=== Signing of the Paris Agreement at the UN ===
It was no accident that the United Nations selected Earth Day to sign the most significant climate accord in the history of the climate movement. On Earth Day 2016, world leaders from 175 nations broke a record by doing exactly that.

=== Earth Day 2017 ===
For Earth Day 2017, Earth Day Network launched the goal of global environmental and climate literacy by 2020. EDN envisioned a world that is fluent in the concepts of climate change and aware of its unprecedented threat to our planet. Environmental and climate literacy is the engine not only for creating green voters and advancing environmental and climate laws and policies but also for accelerating green technologies and jobs.

To that end, the 2017 Earth Day theme is environmental and climate education. EDN knows that education is the foundation for progress. Before we can solve the dire environmental threats facing us in the 21st century, we must build a global citizenry knowledgeable in environmental science and fluent in local and global ecological issues. A world with a more educated populace internalizes values – such as environmental protection – and is empowered to act in defense of these values.

To support this Earth Day theme, EDN promoted teach-ins as an activity to educate communities on global environmental issues and how global environmental issues impact local communities. EDN teach-ins strove to empower attendees with real, tangible actions they could take for the environment.

EDN developed an extensive global outreach strategy to promote Earth Day and assist organizations with producing a variety of actions, including teach-ins, in their own communities. Staff sent thousands of emails and made hundreds of phone calls and revamped the organization's social media. Additionally, EDN created five teach-in toolkits, with accompanying translations in four languages, to help constituencies organize and mobilize their communities.

Finally, EDN hosted the flagship March for Science march, rally, and teach-ins on Earth Day on the Washington Monument Grounds in Washington D.C. This event rallied and empowered attendees to support science and evidence-based policy. Approximately 100,000 people attended.

=== Earth Day 2018 ===
Earth Day 2018's theme, End Plastic pollution, was dedicated to building a world of educated citizens who understand the environmental, climate, and health consequences of using plastic. Through an online Plastics Pollution Calculator, consumers calculated how much disposable plastic they used in a year and planned how to reduce this amount of waste. A Plastic Pollution Primer and Action Toolkit also educated consumers about actions to reduce their plastic footprint. Events worldwide in The Gambia, Italy, Thailand, Japan, India, the U.S., among others, included plastic cleanups, teach-ins, and festivals in which 10,000 partners participated. In April 2018, the Google search for "Plastic Pollution" saw the highest trends in the previous five years, 5.5 million pages in 17 languages were created on the internet about "Earth Day 2018" and "plastics," and global media outlets with a combined audience of 450+ million people covered the campaign. The phrase "plastic pollution" on social media in the U.S. alone reached more than 155 million people. As a result, over 23,0000+ plastic cleanups were registered on Google, 60 countries introduced single-use plastic bans and legislation, and companies such as Coca-Cola and Starbucks announced steps to eliminate and significantly reduce plastic pollution.

=== Earth Day 2019 ===
Earth Day 2019's theme was Protect Our Species. For this campaign, events and programs spread information about the causes and consequences of growing species extinctions.

== Earth Day 2020–2030 ==
=== Earth Day 2020 ===
Earth Day 2020 was the 50th Anniversary of Earth Day. Celebrations included activities such as the Great Global CleanUp, Citizen Science, Advocacy, Education, and art. The theme for Earth Day 2020 was "climate action". Due to the COVID-19 pandemic, many of the planned activities were moved online. Notably, a coalition of youth activist organized by the Future Coalition hosted Earth Day Live, a three-day livestream commemorating the 50th anniversary of Earth Day in the United States. Celebratory activities centered around five components: citizen science, volunteering, community engagement, education, and the role of art in furthering the cause.

=== Earth Day 2021 ===
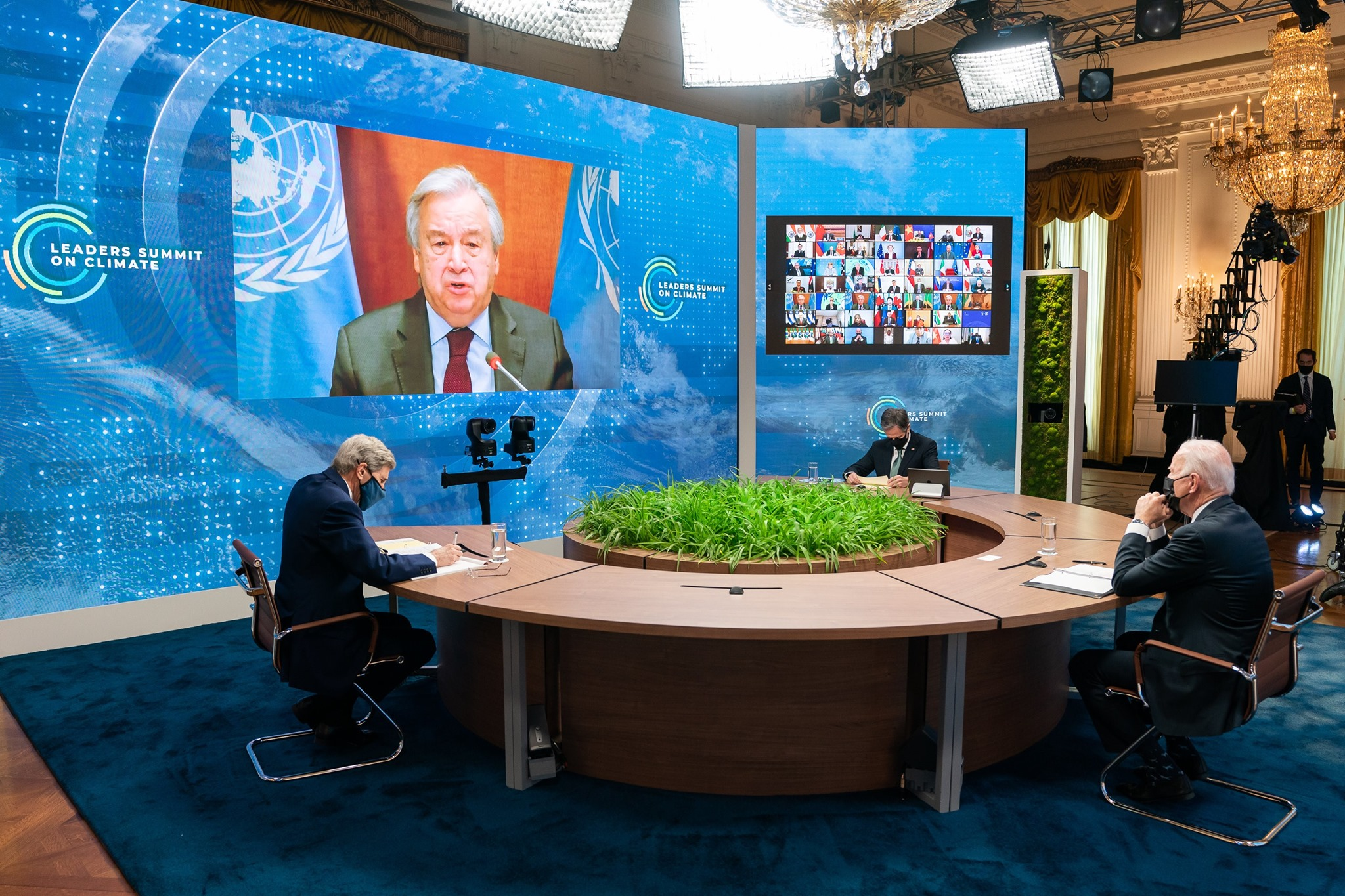
United Nations Secretary-General António Guterres addresses the Leaders' Summit on Climate.

The Earth Day 2021 theme was Restore Our Earth and features five primary programs: The Canopy Project, Food and Environment, Climate Literacy, the Global Earth Challenge, and The Great Global CleanUp. During the week of Earth Day, earthday.org and lead organizers, Education International, Hip Hop Caucus, and Earth Uprising organized three separate parallel climate action summits on climate literacy, environmental justice, and youth-led climate-focused issues. Earthday.org also organized the second-annual Earth Day Live livestream event (April 22, 2021) featuring global activists, international leaders, and influencers.

The Biden administration organized a 2021 Leaders' Climate Summit. This virtual Zoom-like meeting featured 40 world leaders and dozens of speakers, including Pope Francis, Xiye Bastida, Danielle Merfeld, Vice President and Chief Technology Officer, GE Renewable Energy, Anna Borg, President and CEO, Vattenfall, and Abdullah Subai, Minister of Municipality and Environment, Qatar.

=== Earth Day 2022 ===
The Earth Day 2022 theme was Invest in Our Planet and features five primary programs: The Great Global Cleanup, Sustainable Fashion, Climate and Environmental Literacy, Canopy Project, Food and Environment, and the Global Earth Challenge. Earthday.org announced the continuation of the "Invest in our Planet" theme for 2023 and that more than one billion citizens participated in Earth Day 2022. On April 22, Wynn Alan Bruce self-immolated in front of the United States Supreme Court Building in an act of protest against climate inaction.

=== Earth Day 2023 ===
The official theme for 2023 was "Invest In Our Planet". On Earth Day 2023, a collection of images of Earth taken from various deep space distances in the Solar System was published.

=== Earth Day 2024 ===
The theme for Earthday.org 2024 was Planet vs. Plastics and to mark that Earthday.org has called for a 60% global reduction in plastic production by 2040.

In November 2023, to bring public attention to the health threat that microplastics pose, earthday.org released its report Babies vs. Plastics, which collated some of the latest science on the subject. The Guardian newspaper carried an Op Ed about the report highlighting that it is the children of the Global South who are being the most impacted by exposure to microplastics.

=== Earth Day 2025 and 2026 ===
The Earth Day 2025 and 2026 theme was Our Power, Our Planet, which emphasizes collective action, community mobilization, and the transition to renewable energy to drive environmental progress.

== Earth Day Canada ==
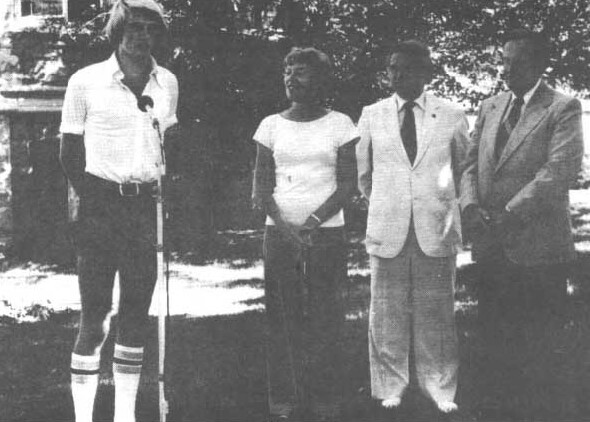
Paul Tinari officially launched the first Canadian Earth Day on September 11, 1980 – included are Flora MacDonald MP, Ken Keyes and Dr. Ronald Watts.

The first Canadian Earth Day (French: Jour de la Terre) was held on Thursday, September 11, 1980, and was organized by Paul D. Tinari, then a graduate student in Engineering Physics/Solar Engineering at Queen's University. Flora MacDonald, then MP for Kingston and the Islands and former Canadian Secretary of State for External Affairs, officially opened Earth Day Week on September 6, 1980, with a ceremonial tree planting and encouraged MPs and MPPs across the country to declare a cross-Canada annual Earth Day. The principal activities taking place on the first Earth Day included educational lectures given by experts in various environmental fields, garbage and litter pick-up by students along city roads and highways, and tree plantings to replace the trees killed by Dutch elm disease.

== History of the Equinox Earth Day (March 20) ==
The equinoctial Earth Day is celebrated on the March equinox (around March 20) to mark the arrival of astronomical spring in the Northern Hemisphere, and of astronomical autumn in the Southern Hemisphere. An equinox in astronomy is that point in time (not a whole day) when the Sun is directly above the Earth's equator, occurring around March 20 and September 23 each year. In most cultures, the equinoxes and solstices are considered to start or separate the seasons, although weather patterns evolve earlier.

John McConnell first introduced the idea of a global holiday called "Earth Day" at the 1969 UNESCO Conference on the Environment. The first Earth Day proclamation was issued by San Francisco Mayor Joseph Alioto on March 21, 1970. Celebrations were held in various cities, such as San Francisco and in Davis, California with a multi-day street party. UN Secretary-General U Thant supported McConnell's global initiative to celebrate this annual event; and on February 26, 1971, he signed a proclamation to that effect, saying:

May there be only peaceful and cheerful Earth Days to come for our beautiful Spaceship Earth as it continues to spin and circle in frigid space with its warm and fragile cargo of animate life.

United Nations secretary-general Kurt Waldheim observed Earth Day with similar ceremonies on the March equinox in 1972, and the United Nations Earth Day ceremony has continued each year since on the day of the March equinox (the United Nations also works with organizers of the April 22 global event). Margaret Mead added her support for the equinox Earth Day, and in 1978 declared:

Earth Day is the first holy day which transcends all national borders, yet preserves all geographical integrities, spans mountains and oceans and time belts, and yet brings people all over the world into one resonating accord, is devoted to the preservation of the harmony in nature and yet draws upon the triumphs of technology, the measurement of time, and instantaneous communication through space.

Earth Day draws on astronomical phenomena in a new way – which is also the most ancient way – by using the Vernal Equinox, the time when the Sun crosses the equator making the length of night and day equal in all parts of the Earth. To this point in the annual calendar, EARTH DAY attaches no local or divisive set of symbols, no statement of the truth or superiority of one way of life over another. But the selection of the March Equinox makes planetary observance of a shared event possible and a flag that shows the Earth, as seen from space, appropriate.

— Kurt Waldheim

At the moment of the equinox, it is traditional to observe Earth Day by ringing the Japanese Peace Bell, which Japan donated to the United Nations. Over the years, celebrations have occurred in various places worldwide at the same time as the UN celebration. On March 20, 2008, in addition to the ceremony at the United Nations, ceremonies were held in New Zealand, and bells were sounded in California, Vienna, Paris, Lithuania, Tokyo, and many other locations. The equinox Earth Day at the UN is organized by the Earth Society Foundation.

Earth Day ringing the peace bell is celebrated around the world in many towns, ringing the Peace Bell in Vienna, Berlin, and elsewhere. A memorable event took place at the UN in Geneva, celebrating a Minute for Peace ringing the Japanese Shinagawa Peace Bell with the help of the Geneva Friendship Association and the Global Youth Foundation, directly after in deep mourning about the Fukushima Daiichi Nuclear Power Plant catastrophe ten days before.

Besides the Spring Equinox for the Northern Hemisphere, the observance of the Spring Equinox for the Southern Hemisphere in September is of equal importance. The International Day of Peace is celebrated on September 21, and can thus be considered to accord with the original intentions of John McConnell, U Thant and others.

== April 22 observances ==
=== Growing eco-activism before Earth Day 1970 ===
In 1968, Morton Hilbert and the U.S. Public Health Service organized the Human Ecology Symposium, an environmental conference for students to hear from scientists about the effects of environmental degradation on human health. This was the beginning of Earth Day. For the next two years, Hilbert and students worked to plan the first Earth Day. In April 1970 – along with a federal proclamation from U.S. Sen. Gaylord Nelson – the first Earth Day was held.

Project Survival, an early environmentalism-awareness education event, was held at Northwestern University on January 23, 1970. This was the first of several events held at university campuses across the United States in the lead-up to the first Earth Day. Also, Ralph Nader began talking about the importance of ecology in 1970.

The 1960s had been a very dynamic period for ecology in the US. Pre-1960 grassroots activism against DDT in Nassau County, New York, and widespread opposition to open-air nuclear weapons tests with their global nuclear fallout, had inspired Rachel Carson to write her influential bestseller, Silent Spring (1962).

=== Significance of April 22 ===
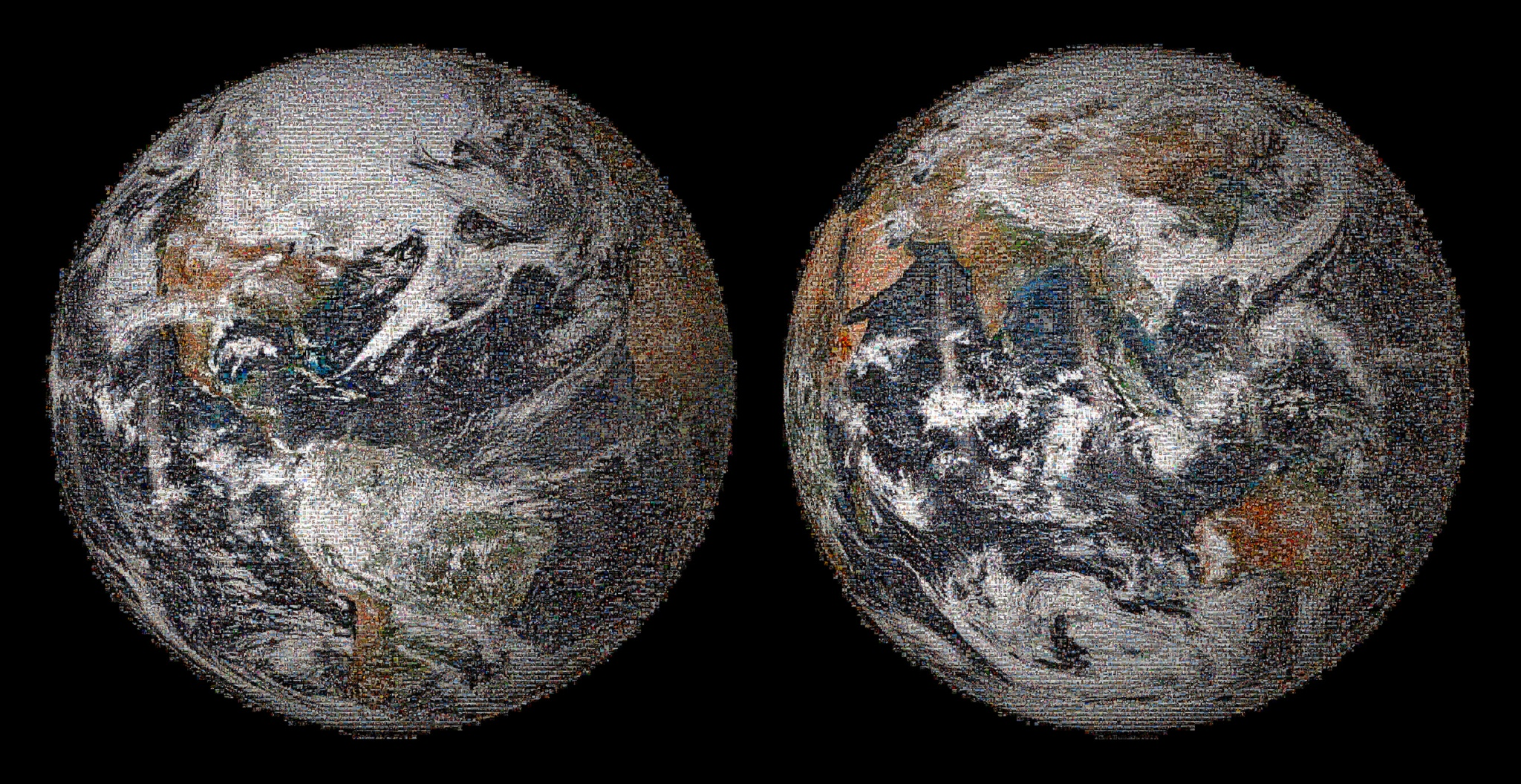
Global selfie – Earth Day, April 22, 2014

Nelson chose the date to maximize participation on college campuses for what he conceived as an "environmental teach-in". He determined the week of April 19–25 was the best bet as it did not fall during exams or spring breaks. Moreover, it did not conflict with religious holidays such as Easter or Passover, and was late enough in spring to have decent weather. More students were likely to be in class, and there would be less competition with other mid-week events – so he chose Wednesday, April 22. The day also fell after the anniversary of the birth of noted conservationist John Muir. The National Park Service, John Muir National Historic Site, has a celebration every year on or around Earth Day (April 21, 22 or 23), called Birthday–Earth Day, in recognition of Earth Day and John Muir's contribution to the collective consciousness of environmentalism and conservation.

Unbeknownst to Nelson, April 22, 1970, was coincidentally the 100th anniversary of the birth of Vladimir Lenin, when translated to the Gregorian calendar (which the Soviets adopted in 1918). Time reported that some suspected the date was not a coincidence, but a clue that the event was "a Communist trick", and quoted a member of the Daughters of the American Revolution as saying, "subversive elements plan to make American children live in an environment that is good for them." J. Edgar Hoover, director of the U.S. Federal Bureau of Investigation, may have found the Lenin connection intriguing; it was alleged the FBI conducted surveillance at the 1970 demonstrations. The idea that the date was chosen to celebrate Lenin's centenary still persists in some quarters, an idea borne out by the similarity with the subbotnik instituted by Lenin in 1920 as days on which people would have to do community service, which typically consisted in removing rubbish from public property and collecting recyclable material. Subbotniks were also imposed on other countries within the compass of Soviet power, including Eastern Europe, and at the height of its power the Soviet Union established a nationwide subbotnik to be celebrated on Lenin's birthday, April 22, which had been proclaimed a national holiday celebrating communism by Nikita Khrushchev in 1955.

== Criticisms ==
"Critics of Earth Day claim that the environmental movement is a middle class, anti-business movement that deals in mainstream conservation politics. It allegedly overlooks the needs of minorities and the poor who are victims of environmental racism and classism."

Another criticism of Earth Day is that after so many years, its continued, repetitious existence promotes the illusion that current human efforts are enough to eliminate future environmental disaster.

== See also ==
- 1970 in the environment
- Arbor Day
- Carbon footprint
- "Earth", a song by Lil Dicky
- Earth Anthem
- Earth Charter
- Earth Hour
- Earth Overshoot Day
- Earth Strike
- Ecology Flag
- Environmental politics
- Expo '74: "Celebrating Tomorrow's Fresh New Environment"
- International Day of Forests
- International environmental agreement
- International Mother Earth Day
- World Soil Day
- Ira Einhorn
- Live Earth
- Pale Blue Dot
- Politics of global warming
- World Environment Day, an awareness day of the United Nations Environment Programme (UNEP)
- World Water Day
