= Project Survival =

Early modern environmentalist activism event

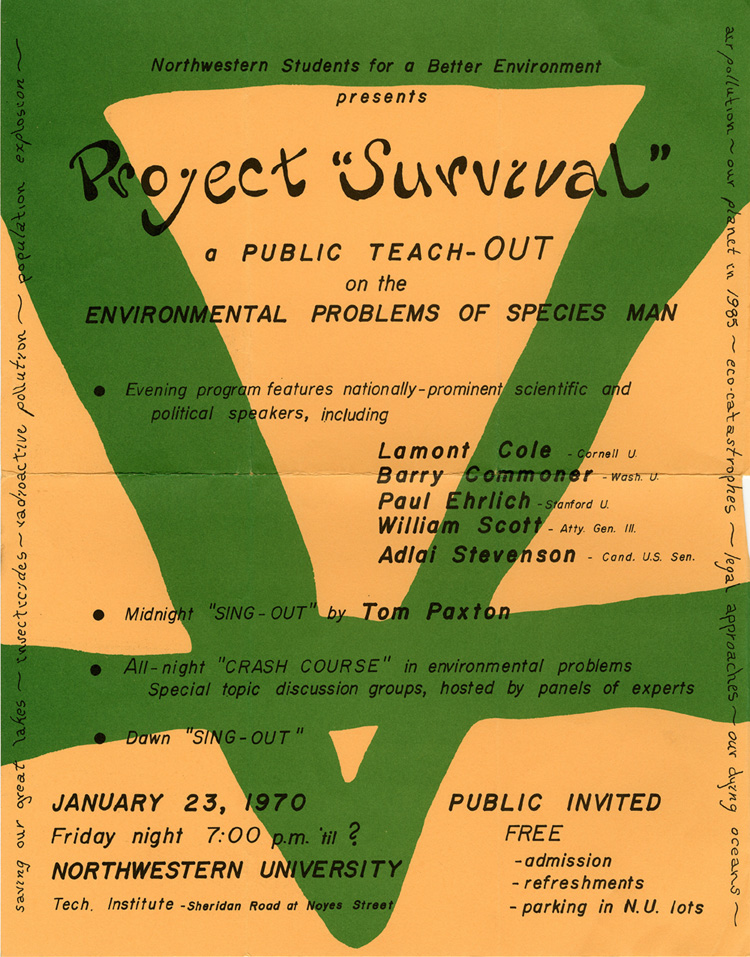
A Project Survival poster

Project Survival, an early environmentalism-awareness education event, was held at Northwestern University on January 23, 1970. Project Survival's scope was determined by Northwestern Students for a Better Environment (NSBE), a group that was started after one meeting discussing the effects of pollutants on Lake Michigan in 1969, and an initiative was created to include the public in understanding the negative effects of pollution on our environment and to explore ways to address it. The group stated that similar movements like Project Survival would sweep across campuses throughout the nation. The event was the first of several held at campuses across the United States in the lead-up to the first Earth Day.

== Purpose ==
Project Survival was not an Earth Day event itself, but rather the first of several preparatory events in the months leading up to Earth Day, April 22, that sought to introduce the environmentalist movement's ideas into the public discourse. Organized by Northwestern Students for a Better Environment, it was referred to as a "teach-out," emphasizing the desire to pass a message along to the community outside the school.

== Participants ==
The event took place in Northwestern University's Technological Institute. Nearly 10,000 attendees (estimated by organizers) listened to speakers including Illinois State Treasurer Adlai Stevenson III, Illinois Lt. Gov. Paul Simon, and a number of scientists, including Dr. Paul Ehrlich of Stanford University, Dr. Lawrence B. Slobodkin, director of the Evolution and Ecology program at Stony Brook University, and Dr. Barry Commoner, director of Washington University's Center for the Biology of Natural Systems. Folk singer Tom Paxton led a midnight "sing-in" where he introduced the song "Whose Garden Was This?," three months before it would become an anthem for the first Earth Day.

During the lecture segment of the program, a group of thirty American Indians took the stage, interrupting Dr. Slobodkin, to present a list of demands:

The group, from the Native American Committee of Chicago, protested "pollution of Indian lands, religions and minds." They demanded that NU confront Federal agencies that have "polluted" Indians, provide 15 jobs for Indians, offer 15 scholarships and hire speakers " to teach you the truth about the American Indian."

Discussion groups met from 1 a.m. to 6 a.m. to address various topics including over-population, depletion of natural resources, overcrowding, pollution, and nuclear power. Panel titles included: "Surplus People and Instant War," "Life or Death for the Oceans," and "Radioactivity & Prenatal Fatalities."

A film of the event was produced to help other schools prepare for Earth Day and the text of the event's speeches was published in a limited printing by Northwestern. Many of the student organizers of Project Survival, among them Casey Jason, Jim Reisa, Warren Muir, Jim Robin and John Stegeman, earned PhD or MD degrees and went on to careers influential still today in environmental science and policy.

== Aftermath ==
Following the event, Project Survival became an organization at the university, with a mission to initiate, sponsor, and encourage the study of environmental problems, and to bring information on the topic to the school at large. Northwestern Students for a Better Environment would organize “Sunrise ‘78” in 1978, expanding on solar energy and alternative sources of energy to help improve the environment. The organization continued to be involved in Earth Day-related events after Project Survival, including changing its name to Students for Ecological and Environmental Development (SEED) and organizing the Green Cup competition that exists to this day.
