= International Mother Earth Day =

International observance, 22 April

- International Mother Earth Day
- Date: April 22
- Location: All UN Member States
- Inaugurated: April 22, 2010
- Most recent: Ongoing

International Mother Earth Day was established in 2009, by the United Nations General Assembly under Resolution A/RES/63/278. The Resolution was introduced by Bolivia and endorsed by over 50 member states. It recognizes that "the Earth and its ecosystems are our home" and that "it is necessary to promote harmony with nature and the Earth." The term Mother Earth is used because it "reflects the interdependence that exists among human beings, other living species and the planet we all inhabit". It is decided to designate April 22 as International Mother Earth Day.

General Assembly President Miguel d'Escoto Brockmann welcomed the creation of International Mother Earth Day, saying: "International Mother Earth Day promotes a view of the Earth as the entity that sustains all living things found in nature. Inclusiveness is at the heart of International Mother Earth Day; fostering shared responsibilities to rebuild our troubled relationship with nature is a cause that is uniting people around the world."

== History ==
In 1968, Morton Hilbert and the U.S. Public Health Service organized the Human Ecology Symposium, where a conference was held for students to listen to scientists discuss the effects of environmental degradation on human health. This was the first precursor to Earth Day. Over the next two years, Hilbert and his students worked to plan the first Earth Day. Other efforts such as the Survival Project, one of the earliest educational events for environmental awareness, took place at Northwestern University on January 23, 1970. This was the first of several events held on university campuses across the United States. Another founder was Ira Einhorn. Additionally, Ralph Nader began speaking about the importance of ecology in 1970.

The first Earth Day event took place on April 22, 1970, initiated by Senator and environmental activist Gaylord Nelson to advocate for the creation of an environmental agency. This event saw participation from two thousand universities, ten thousand primary and secondary schools, and hundreds of communities. The social pressure yielded results, and the United States government established the Environmental Protection Agency (EPA) and a series of laws aimed at protecting the environment.
