= Airlie Conference Center =

Historical hotel building in Airlie, VA

- Former names: Airlie; Airlie Hotel; Airlie Center; Airlie House

General information
- Architectural style: Georgian Revival; Colonial Revival
- Location: Airlie, Virginia, US
- Year built: 1899
- Renovated: 1924; 1961
- Owner: American University

Technical details
- Floor area: 18,570 square feet (1,725 m^{2})
- Grounds: 300 acres

Design and construction
- Architects: Harry Connelly Groom; Dr. Murdoch Head

Other information
- Number of rooms: 150
- Number of suites: 14

References
- "Meetings at Airlie". www.virginia.org.

The Airlie Conference Center, commonly referred to simply as Airlie, is a historic hotel outside of Warrenton, Virginia. The compound is best known for having become a safe space for dialogue during the US civil rights movement, and as the origin of Earth Day. It is located at 6809 Airlie Rd, Warrenton, Virginia 20187.

== History ==
=== Original estate 1899-1958 ===
In the 1890s, socialite Harry Connelly Groom moved from Philadelphia, Pennsylvania, to Fauquier County, Virginia. There he purchased land to build a manor from Adeline h. Edmonds. Groom named the estate the "Airlie House," after a Scottish castle.

In 1924, a fire and accompanying structural accident caused damage throughout the building. Because of this, Groom renovated the house through the 1930s. After his death, his daughter Susan Groom Harney inherited the estate.

=== Modern building 1959-1970 ===
Harney sold the home to Dr. Murdoch Head in 1959, who embarked on a series of renovations to create a hotel and conference facility. The renamed "Airlie Center," opened in 1961 with a variety of new programs held at the facility including environmental research, public health, and education.

In 1962, Life Magazine dubbed the Airlie Center an "island of thought" to which professionals could retreat without distractions. That year, the NAACP hosted its first annual civil rights conference at Airlie. Dr. Martin Luther King Jr. visited Airlie later in the 1960s.

In 1969, Wisconsin Senator Gaylord Nelson sponsored a conference at Airlie to promote Earth Day, a then new holiday he created with U.S. Representative Pete McCloskey.

=== 1971-present ===
Democratic Congressmembers meeting at Airlie, July 13, 1975

During the 1980s a film company named Airlie Productions operated at the center. The company produced over 250 documentaries and won three Emmy's.

In 1988, more than 150 LGBTQ individuals attended The War Conference to promote human rights. The purpose of this conference was to increase support from legislators and civil rights organizations.

In 2014, the Airlie Hotel opened to the public for the first time in its history. The next year, Airlie was inducted into the Historic Hotels of America.

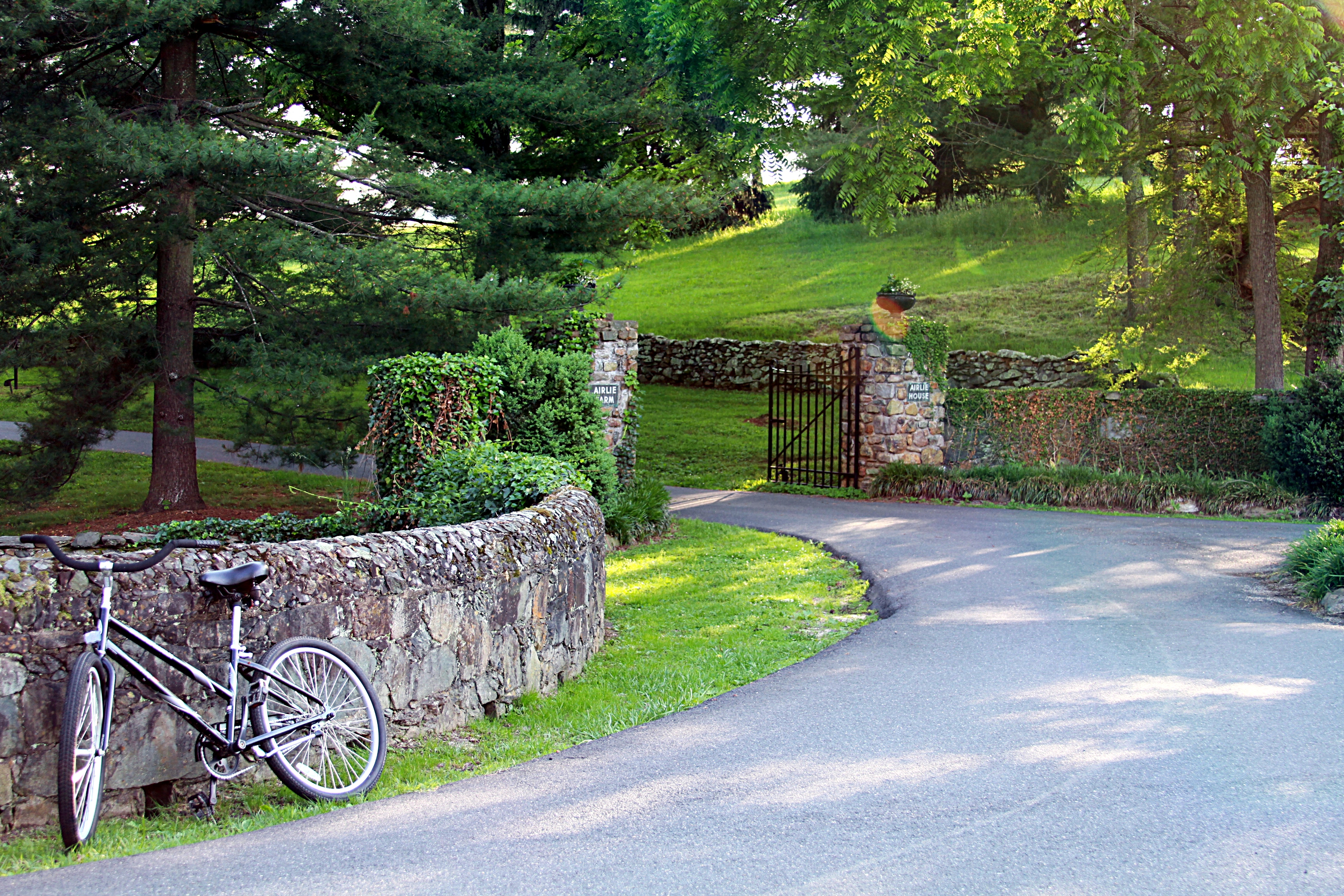
Entrance to the Airlie Conference Center

In 2016, the Airlie Foundation entrusted American University with stewardship of the property.

== Conception of Earth Day ==
Senator Nelson was inspired by the Vietnam anti-war movement to promote environmental conservation. He and Representative McCloskey gave a speech at Airlie in 1969 to establish a new holiday, "Earth Day," to promote their environmental conservationist ideals. Earth Day would eventually become a well-established international holiday.

In 1993, Senator Nelson planted a tree at Airlie to commemorate their 1969 meeting that promoted the Earth Day holiday.
