= John McConnell (peace activist) =

American environmentalist (1915-2012)

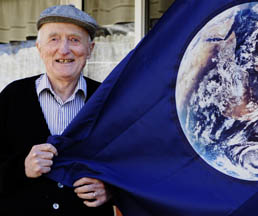
- McConnell in front of his home in Denver, Colorado, USA with the Earth Flag he designed
- Born: March 22, 1915; Davis City, Iowa, U.S
- Died: October 20, 2012 (aged 97)
- Known for: Founder of Earth Day

John McConnell (March 22, 1915 – October 20, 2012) was the founder and creator of Earth Day, and The Earth Society Foundation. He was known for designing the Earth Flag, pursuing causes relating to peace, religion, and science.

== Early years ==
John McConnell was born on March 22, 1915, in Davis City, Iowa, United States. He was the son of a Pentecostal preacher and traveling doctor. His first interest in the Earth began in 1939 while partnering with Albert Nobell, a chemist, in the Nobell Research Laboratory in Los Angeles that built a factory for the manufacture of plastics. Realizing how much the manufacture of plastic polluted the Earth, his concern for ecology grew. Afterward, he was a lifetime believer in care of the environment, founded on his Christian beliefs. He stated that leading into World War II, he believed that love and prayer could be more powerful than bombs.

On October 31, 1957, soon after the first successful Sputnik launch, McConnell wrote an editorial, calling for peaceful cooperation in the exploration of Space with a visible "Star of Hope" satellite. This led him to create a "Star of Hope" organization to foster international cooperation in space.

== Major actions and campaigns ==
=== Peace activism ===
In 1959 to pursue his dream of peace, John McConnell moved to California where he and his co-publisher, Erling Toness, founded the "Mountain View". Along with the "Mountain View", he organized a campaign in San Francisco in 1962 called "Meals for Millions". It was used to feed thousands of Hong Kong refugees. In 1963, after the "Meals for Millions" campaign, McConnell worked on another campaign called "Minute for Peace" for seven years following "Meals for Millions". He began his "Minute for Peace" campaign with a broadcast on December 22, 1963, ending the mourning period for the late president, John F. Kennedy. On June 26, 1965, McConnell spoke at the National Education Association Convention in Madison Square Garden, where the public came together for a "Minute for Peace".

=== Earth Day ===
McConnell's concern for the environment grew in the late 1950s and early 1970s. A Christian, he believed humans have an obligation to take care of the Earth, and to share its resources equally, based on such passages as Psalms 115:16, "The earth has been given to the children of men." He was moved when he saw the first picture of the Earth printed in Life magazine. Later that picture became the symbol on the Earth Day flag which he designed and created.

In October 1969, at the UNESCO conference in San Francisco, McConnell proposed a global holiday to celebrate Earth's life and beauty and to advance peace. Along with the celebration of life on Earth, he intended Earth Day to alert people about the need for preserving and renewing the threatened ecological balance upon which all life on Earth depends. The proposal won strong support and was followed by an Earth Day Proclamation by the City of San Francisco on March 1, 1970, "Honor the Earth" and the first celebration of Earth Day on March 21, 1970. In June 1970, McConnell created the Earth Day Proclamation for worldwide use and awareness, which declared the principles and responsibilities the signers undertook to care for the Earth. It was signed by 36 world leaders, including UN Secretary General U Thant, Margaret Mead, John Gardner and others.

The spring equinox Earth Day is celebrated in the Northern Hemisphere in many cities with ringing of peace bells. Earth Day has been celebrated annually since 1970 at the United Nations with ringing of the UN Peace Bell.

== The Earth Society Foundation.org. ==
In June 1973, McConnell formed "The Earth Society Foundation". Margaret Mead later joined the foundation in September 1976 as the international chairman of Earth Day. The Earth Society, Inc. became The Earth Society Foundation, Inc. in December 1976.

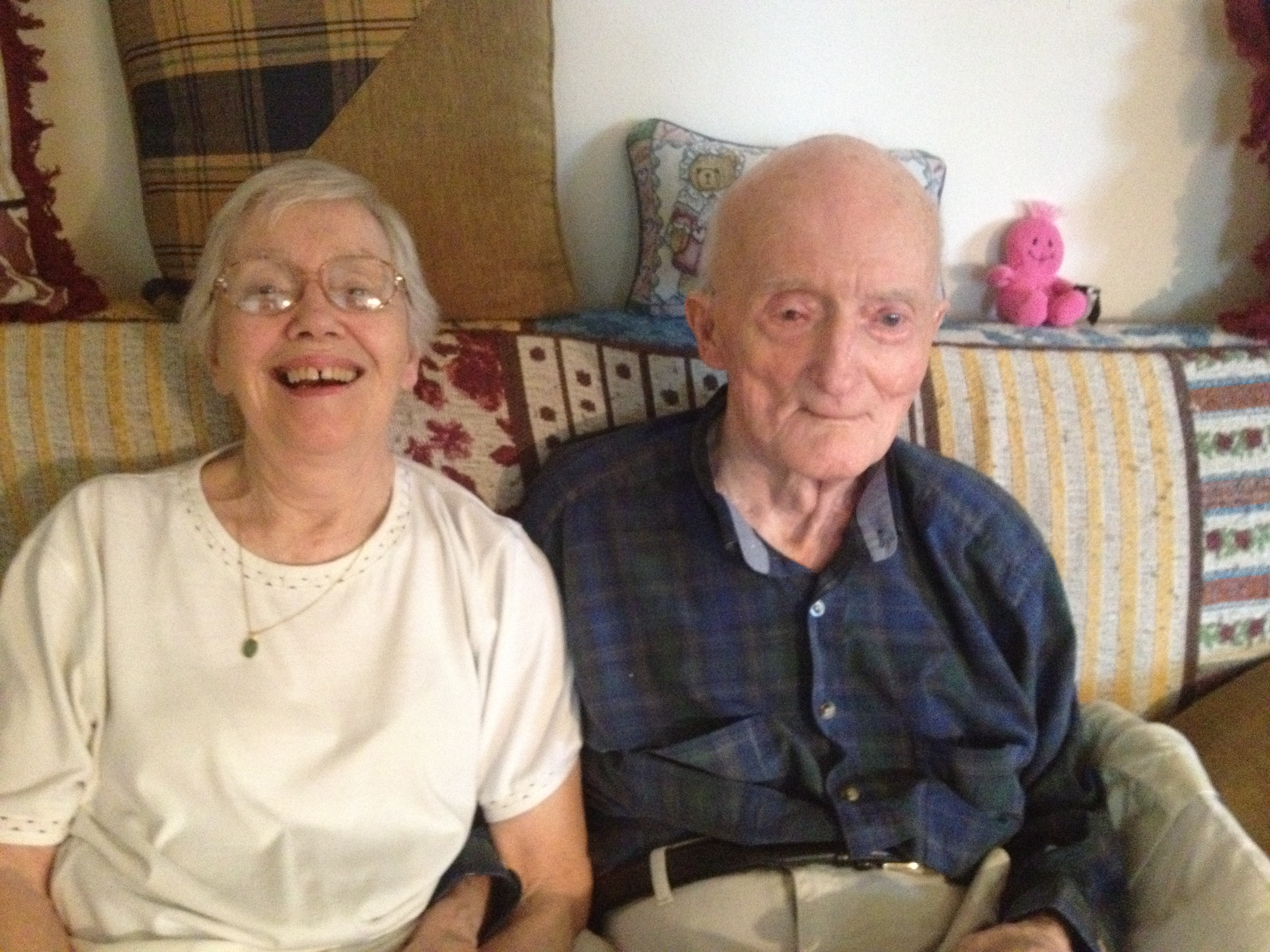
Anna and John McConnell one month before his death in Denver, CO. Sept.11, 2012

== See also ==
- List of peace activists
