= Airlie, Virginia =

Unincorporated community in Virginia, United States

- Hotel/Conference Center
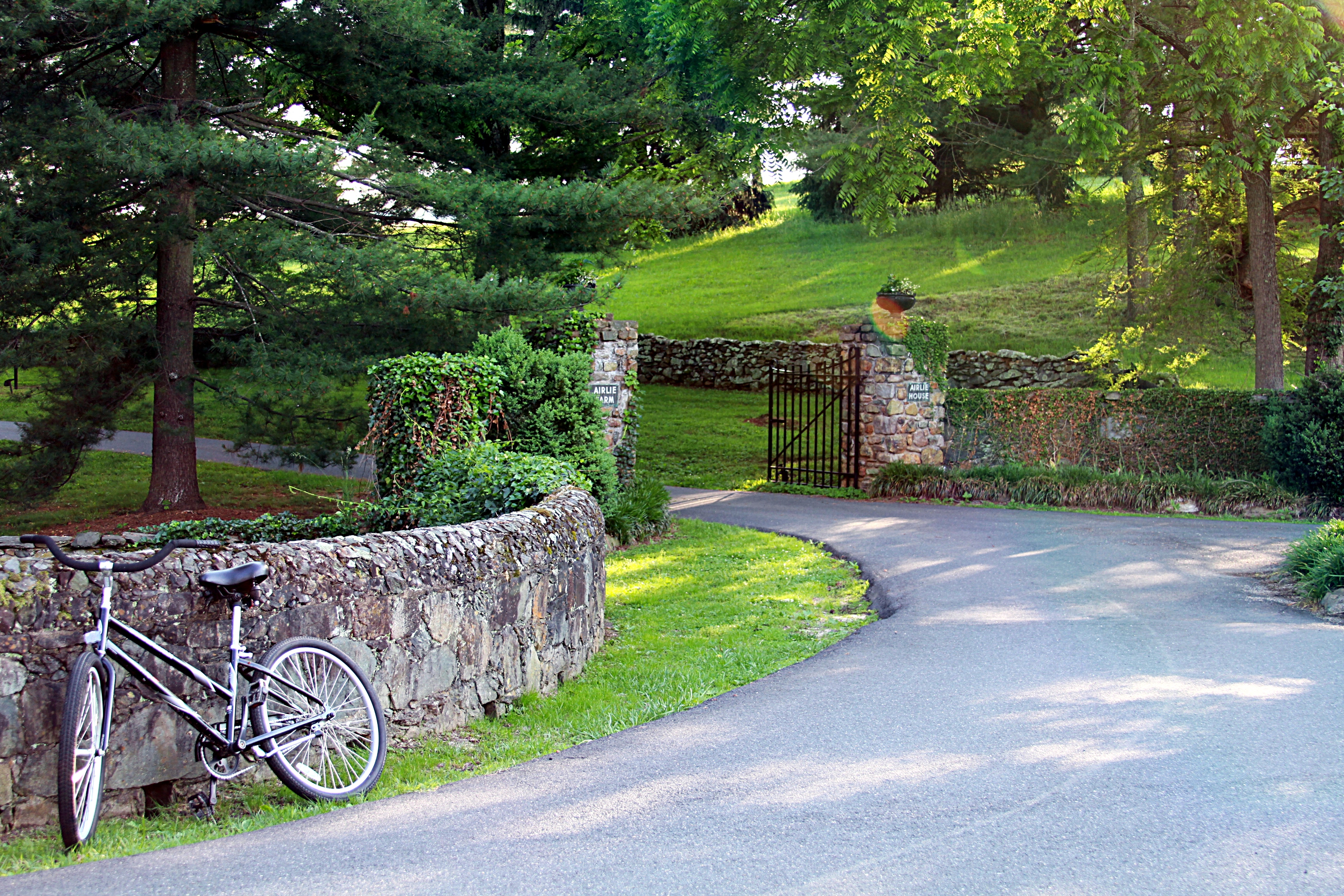
- Entrance to the Airlie Conference Center

- Location within Northern Virginia Location within Virginia Location within the United States
- Coordinates: 38°39′27″N 77°43′01″W
- Country: United States
- State: Virginia
- County: Fauquier
- Time zone: UTC−5 (Eastern (EST))
  - Summer (DST): UTC−4 (EDT)
- ZIP codes: 20187

Airlie is an unincorporated hamlet in Fauquier County, Virginia, United States, situated between US Routes 17 and 29. The village itself runs along State Route 605, which is named Airlie Road. It is home to the Airlie Conference Center and Harry's Restaurant. The original post office for Airlie was closed and the building was converted to be part of the meeting facilities in the 1990s. Airlie is within the Warrenton 20187 ZIP Code.

In the 1990s, Operation Migration attempted to train sandhill cranes and Canada geese to migrate between Airlie and Blackstock, Ontario. The Airlie Conference Center also hosted a breeding research program for swans.
