= Japanese Peace Bell =

Bell at the United Nations headquarters

Coordinates: 40°44′58″N 73°58′04″W

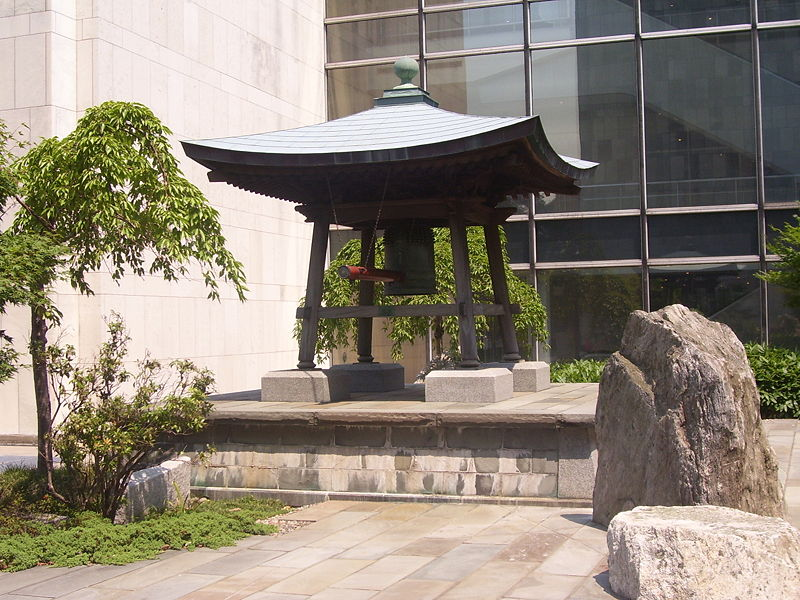
The Japanese Peace Bell at United Nations Headquarters in New York City.

The Japanese Peace Bell is a bell donated to the United Nations Headquarters in New York City via the United Nations Association of Japan in June 1954. It is a bonsho (a Buddhist temple bell) that is 60 centimeters in diameter, 1 meter in height, and 116 kg (256 lb) in weight. It was established by Chiyoji Nakagawa.

Ceremonies are held at the opening of the United Nations General Assembly in September each year as well as on the International Day of Peace on September 21, when the bell is rung in honor of world peace by the Secretary General, UN executives, and other public figures.

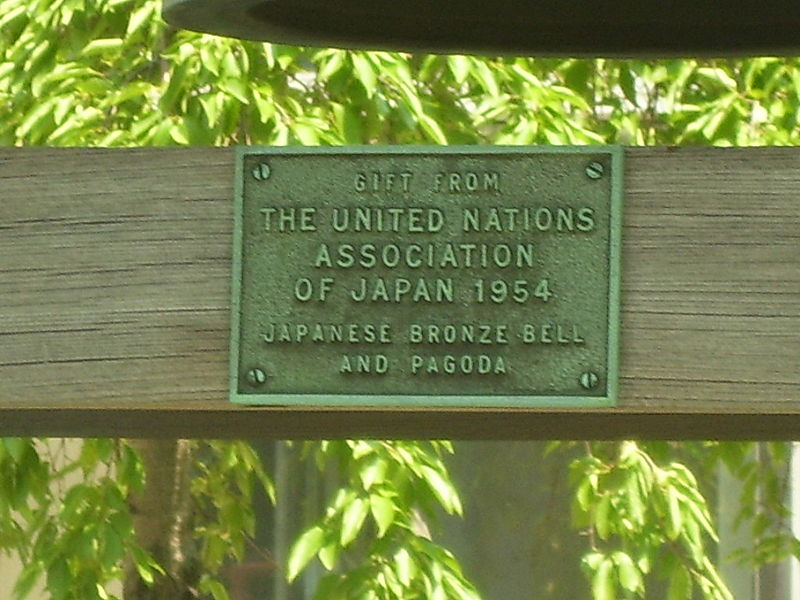
Dedication plaque for the United Nations' Japanese Peace Bell.

== Description and history ==
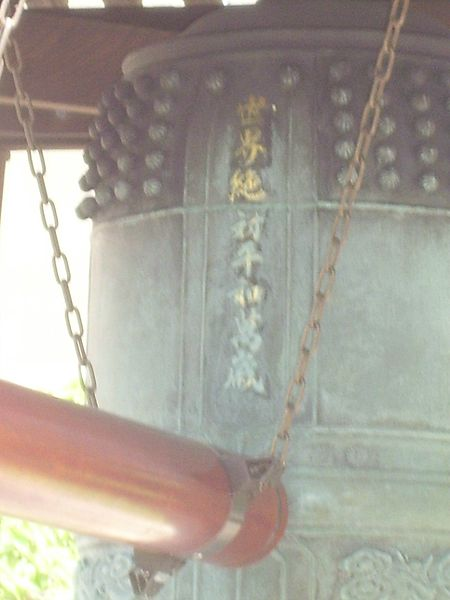
Japanese inscriptions on the Japanese Peace Bell of the United Nations Headquarters, New York City.

In 1951, Chiyoji Nakagawa, who was then a council member of the UN Association of Japan and later became the mayor of Uwajima City (Ehime prefecture), participated in the 6th General Assembly of the United Nations held in Paris at his own expense as an observer from Uwajima, a city located in the south-west of the Shikoku region. With the aid of Benjamin Cohen, the Secretary General, he appealed to national representatives: “I want to collect coins and medals from people all over the world, going beyond differences in ideas, principles, regions, races, and nationalities, to melt them into one molded piece to cast a bell as a symbol of the wish for peace and present it to the United Nations headquarters. I want the bell to be tolled for peace.”

No objection was raised from the representatives; the proposal was approved unanimously and officially accepted by the UN Economic and Social Council in the following year. They decided to place the bell in the Japanese Garden of the United Nations headquarters as the “Japanese Peace Bell.”

Starting from the coins received from representatives from more than sixty countries that endorsed the purpose and 9 gold coins from Pius XII, the Pope of Rome, Nakagawa spent three years visiting countries all over the world to collect the coins and commissioned Tada Foundry in Takamatsu City (Kagawa Prefecture) to found the bell.

The Japanese characters “世界絶対平和萬歳” ((hep: sekai zettai heiwa banzai), lit. “long live absolute world peace”) are inscribed on the bell, and the sun and the moon are surrounded by laurel, depicted at the point hit by the wooden bell hammer. The belfry, built by Rinpei Oshita, a traditional architectural craftsman in Uwajima, was made in the shape of the blossom temple where Buddha was born and transported to New York from Yokohama Port in 1954 by the Tsuneshima-maru, owned by Iino Kaiun Kaisha, as the maiden voyage for the ship. A handful of sand from atom-bombed areas was sent by a chief Zen priest in Hiroshima and a female Christian student in Nagasaki who survived the bombing, to be carried with the bell and buried under the foundation stone for the belfry. The bell and the belfry were installed in the UN headquarters and a presentation ceremony was held on June 8.

Currently, the Japanese Peace Bell is located in the Japanese Garden of the UN headquarters, and is rung twice a year: around Earth Day on March 21, and for the International Day of Peace on September 21. Notably on the International Day of Peace, the UN Secretary General rings the bell to pray for world peace in the presence of the UN executives, other UN members, and celebrities.

== Casting of the Japanese Peace Bell ==
It is a bronze Buddhist temple bell of 60 cm in diameter, 1 meter in height, and 116 kg in weight. Chiyoji traveled countries all over the world to collect the coins that were used to make it. He received old and current coins, sable guards, bullets, bronze medals, badges of various denominations, and copper plates from a wide variety of people. These were melted down and used for casting, along with the coins received from the representatives of more than sixty countries who participated in the 6th General Assembly of the United Nations held in Paris and the 9 gold coins given by Pius XII, the Pope of Rome.

Chiyoji commissioned Jonosuke Tada XIV, of the distinguished Tada Foundry, to cast the bell and Rinpei Oshita, a traditional architectural craftsman from Uwajima, to build the belfry.

== Osaka Expo and the Peace Bell ==
After installing the Japanese Peace Bell in the UN headquarters in New York, Chiyoji Nakagawa began a series of activities to promote world peace centered around the bell. At the time of the Cuban Missile Crisis in 1961 during the cold war between the US and the Soviet Union, he visited the embassies of both countries and presented replicas of the Japanese Peace Bell, weighing 4 kg each, as sister bells to President Kennedy and Prime Minister Khrushchev via the embassies, with a message: “World peace can be maintained with a little consideration and with smiles.”

When the Expo 1970 was held in Osaka, he sought permission from U Thant, who was then Secretary General of the United Nations, to temporarily bring the Japanese Peace Bell back from the UN headquarters to the Expo site in Osaka to promote the Japanese Peace Bell as people gathered there from all across the world.

Meanwhile, he cast a similar bell to replace the original, during its absence from UN headquarters. The bells were exchanged again after the Expo and the original Japanese Peace Bell was returned to the UN.

The Peace Bell in Expo '70 Commemorative Park is a replacement of the bell used at the UN headquarters. At the same time as the Expo, Chiyoji produced 150 replicas of 1 kg in weight from the same coins used for the original Japanese Peace Bell. He visited the embassies of 140 countries with Secretariat-General U Thant and presented them to the heads of states.

(List of bells presented to the countries around the world by Chiyoji Nakagawa)

== Association for the Preservation of UN Peace Bell (General Incorporated Association) ==
The Association for the Preservation of UN Peace Bell (General Incorporated Association) started its activities in 2013 and Nakagawa’s daughter Seiko Takase established the organization as and served as its representative in 2015, 43 years after her father’s death. The association established the organization under the premise that the existence of the Japanese Peace Bell donated to the United Nations and her father’s hope for world peace were not properly conveyed or communicated by the media. The association’s activities and name were approved by the United Nations in the same year.

Seiko Takase, as the association’s representative, participates in the bell ringing ceremony held in the UN headquarters in New York every year.

=== Activities ===
- Bell ringing ceremony at the UN headquarters
- Bell ringing ceremony at the Expo '70 Commemorative Park. In the fall, the association hosts a ceremony to ring the sister bell of the Japanese Peace Bell at the Expo '70 Commemorative Park in cooperation with the Osaka Prefectural Government.
- Workshops with children
- On behalf of the association, Seiko Takase visits primary and junior high schools and local events nationwide to give lectures about the history and background of the Japanese Peace Bell. The number of participants in the lectures has exceeded 5,000 in total. She also published a picture story book about the Japanese Peace Bell in the UN headquarters with an English translation. The book is available at the UN headquarters in New York.
- In 2017: presented a replica bell of 4 kg in weight to the Myanmar government.
- In 2019: visited the Bosnia and Herzegovina government and presented a replica bell of 4 kg in weight.

In 2019, the association was asked about donating a Japanese Peace Bell to the Republic of San Marino through the intermediation of the San Marino Nippon Matsuri (Japan Festival) Executive Committee, which maintains cultural exchange activities with the country, known as the world’s oldest republic with no record of war. In November, a member of Parliament of San Marino who was Head of Cabinet of the former Minister of Culture came to Japan and had a meeting with Representative Takase. They agreed on the donation of a sister Peace Bell, which is slightly smaller than the original – 80 cm in height, 45 in diameters, and 90 kg in weight – and obtained approval from the Japanese Ministry of Foreign Affairs and the United Nations. This bell would be the fourth largest, following the parent bell in Taihei Temple in Uwajima, the Japanese Peace Bell at the UN headquarters, and the sister bell at the Expo ’70 Commemorative Park.

The Republic of San Marino paid tribute to the donation of the bell, symbolic of the country being decorated for its long history as a country of freedom, without engaging in war.

The same materials were used for this peace bell as the Japanese Peace Bell at UN headquarters and coins were also donated by the people from both countries.

A presentation ceremony for the Peace Bell was initially scheduled at the finale of the San Marino Nippon Matsuri (Japan Festival) on June 21, 2020, but was postponed due to the COVID-19 pandemic. An unveiling ceremony was held in December 2020 under an illuminated Nakadori Avenue, in front of the Shin-Marunouchi Building in Tokyo. The bell, thanks to the friendship between the associations "Association for the Preservation of UN Peace Bell" and "ISSHO-NI San Marino & Japan", arrived in San Marino in 2021 and is now enshrined within the borders of the oldest republic in the world, a land of peace and freedom that has always rejected war throughout its millennia-long history.

At the moment, the Association for the Preservation of UN Peace Bell is developing activities with the help of new participants and cultural influences with the goal of eliminating issues targeted by the UN’s SDGs, including poverty, famine, environmental destruction, and racial discrimination.

== Events and function ==
=== Sounding the bell ===
Traditionally, the Japanese Peace Bell is rung twice a year. It is tolled on the first day of Spring at the time of the vernal equinox, in celebration of the annual Earth Day ceremony initiated by Earth Day Founder, John McConnell.

It is also tolled on every opening day of the UN General Assembly's yearly session in September, coinciding with the International Day of Peace established by the General Assembly in 1981. This occasion is observed by the Secretary-General.

The bell was tolled on October 4, 1966 during the Feast Day of St. Francis, marking the one year anniversary of Pope Paul VI's official visit to the United Nations.

The Bell is infrequently tolled on other special occasions.

=== Earth Day celebrations ===
On Earth Day every year the Earth Society Foundation (founded by John McConnell), is responsible for the Earth Day celebrations that take place at the United Nations Headquarters in New York City. Each year different Honorees are selected to ring the Japanese Peace Bell as part of the celebration.

==== List of Peace Bell honorees ====
Year	Honoree(s)
1971	U Thant, Secretary-General, United Nations
1972	Kurt Waldheim, Secretary-General, United Nations
1973	C.V. Narasimhan, Chef du Cabinet, Under-Secretary-General for Inter-Agency Affairs and Co-ordination, United Nations
1974	Bradford Morse, Administrator, United Nations Development Program (UNDP)
1975	Genichi Akatani, Under-Secretary-General, United Nations
1976	Robert J. Ryan, Assistant Secretary-General, United Nations
1977	Margaret Mead, world renowned anthropologist
1978	Margaret Mead, Earth Day Chairperson
1979	Dr. Estefania Aldaba-Lim, Special Representative (Assistant Secretary-General), United Nations
1980	Dr. Edward Gibson, American Scientist-Astronaut, scientist-pilot Skylab 4
1981	Dr. Arvid Pardo, Malta, United Nations Ambassador, founder of the Law of the Sea Conference
1982	Mrs. René Dubos, wife of the renowned scientist, humanist and Professor Emeritus of The Rockefeller University
1983	Reverend Percival Brown, Trinity Church, Wall Street, New York
1984	Paul McRae, Member of Parliament, representing Prime Minister Pierre Trudeau, Canada
1985	Dr. Robert Muller, Assistant Secretary-General, United Nations
1986	Dr. Robert Muller, Assistant Secretary-General, United Nations
1987	Chester Norris, U.S. Mission, Minister Counselor, Deputy U.S. Representative to UN Economic and Social Council
1987	Valentin Karymov, Senior Counselor, USSR Mission
1987	Sheik Ali Mukhtar, Deputy Secretary-General of the Arab League, Mecca, Saudi Arabia
1988	Edward Abramson, New York State Majority Whip, Earth Day Chairman
1988	Reverend Umberto Mullare
1988	Francis McCullough, Cardinal Krol Center, Philadelphia, PA
1989	Dr. Noel Brown, United Nations Environment Programme (UNEP)
1990	David Dinkins, Mayor, City of New York
1990	Cynthia Lennon, artist, the United Kingdom
1991	Antoine Blanca, Director-General for Development and International Economic Co-operation, United Nations
1992	Joseph Ciccipio, former hostage in Beirut, former acting comptroller of the American University
1992	Anicetas Simutis, Ambassador, Lithuania
1992	Aivars Baumanis, Ambassador, Latvia
1992	Paul Luedig, Counsellor, representing Ernst Jaakson, Ambassadore, Estonia
1993	Rigoberta Menchú, Nobel Peace Prize Laureate, human rights activist, Guatemala
1994	Nasir Obeid, young boy from Palestine
1994	Daphne Tenne, young girl from Israel
1995	Edwina Sandys, artist, and granddaughter of Sir Winston Churchill, the late Prime Minister of the United Kingdom
1996	Richard Butler, Ambassador, Australia
1996	Anna McConnell, wife of John McConnell, Earth Day founder
1997	Razali Ismail, Ambassador, Malaysia, and President of the General Assembly, United Nations
1998	Gillian Sorensen, Under-Secretary-General for External Relations, United Nations
1998	Kensaku Hogen, Under-Secretary for Communications and Public Information, United Nations
1999	Brother Ignatius Harding, Franciscans International Lama Gangchen, Monk, Tibet
2000	Gerhard Pfanzelter, Ambassador, Austria
2001	Mary Catherine Bateson, author and daughter of Margaret Mead and Gregory Bateson
2002	Mrs. Lisbet Palme, Swedish Committee for UNICEF, and wife of Olof Palme, the late Prime Minister of Sweden
2003	Pete Seeger, legendary folk musician and environmentalist
2004	John McConnell, founder of Earth Day and co-founder of the Earth Society Foundation
2005	Aye Aye Thant, daughter of U Thant, UN Secretary-General
2005	Don MacKay, Ambassador, New Zealand, and Acting President of the General Assembly, United Nations
2005	Eduardo J. Sevilla Somoza, Ambassador, Nicaragua
2006	Lars Hjalmar Wide, Ambassador/Chef de Cabinet, Office of the President of the 60th session of the UN General Assembly
2006	Ambassador (& Mrs.) Shinichi Kitaoka, Deputy Permanent Representative of Japan to the UN
2007	Aye Aye Thant, daughter of U Thant, UN Secretary-General
2008	Anwaral Chowdhury, Ambassador, Bangladesh
2009	Pete Seeger, legendary folk musician and environmentalist
2010	Children, including the Tarumi Violinists, surrounded by the children and grandchildren of Earth Day Founders and early supporters
2011	Solange Muller, daughter of the late Dr. Robert Muller, Assistant Secretary-General, United Nations, and renowned peace educator
2011	Aye Aye Thant, daughter of U Thant, UN Secretary-General
2011	Naima Chikhi, UNESCO Representative
2012	Ambassador Anwaral Chowdhury, Bangladesh, Senior Special Advisor to the President of the UN General Assembly
2013	Nikhil Seth, Director of the Division for Sustainable Development, UN Department of Economic and Social Affairs (DESA)
2014	Helen Garland, Chairperson Earth Society Foundation and children of the Tarumi Violinists
2015	Members of the Earth Society Foundation in New York
2016	Ricardo Guimarães Pinto, UNESCO New York Liaison Officer
2017	António Guterres, Secretary-General, United Nations
2018	António Guterres, Secretary-General, United Nations
2019	Professor Tijjani Muhammad-Bande, President-elect of the 74th Session of the United Nations General Assembly
2020	Volkan Bozkır, President of the 75th Session of the United Nations General Assembly
2021	Abdulla Shahid, President of the 76th Session of the United Nations General Assembly
2022	Csaba Kőrösi, President of the 77th Session of the United Nations General Assembly
2023	Dennis Francis, President of the 78th Session of the United Nations General Assembly

== Commemoration ==
=== Anniversaries ===
In 1994, a special ceremony marked the fortieth anniversary of the Japanese Peace Bell. During the occasion, Secretary-General Boutros Boutros-Ghali reiterated that

"Whenever it has sounded, this Japanese Peace Bell has sent a clear message. The message is addressed to all humanity. Peace is precious. It is not enough to yearn for peace. Peace requires work -- long, hard, difficult work."

=== In print ===
A stamp series of the Japanese Peace Bell, designed by Ole Hamann of Denmark, was issued in 1970 as part of the United Nations Postal Service's Art at the United Nations series. The stamps were printed by the Government Printing Bureau of Tokyo.

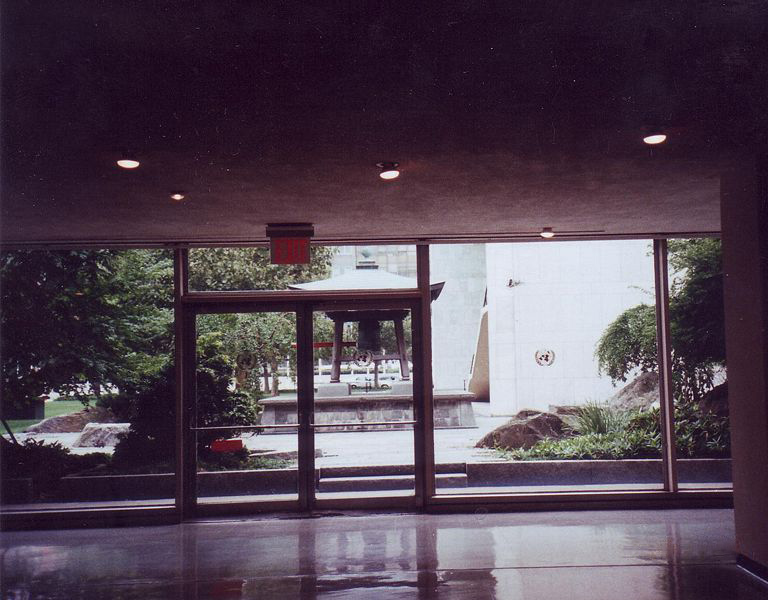
The Japanese Peace Bell, as seen from inside the UN headquarters building in New York City.

== See also ==
- If I Had a Hammer – 1949 song by Pete Seeger and Lee Hays
- Peace symbols – Symbols to promote peace
- United Nations Art Collection – Collection of gifts to the UN
