= Morton Hilbert =

American environmentalist (1917–1998)

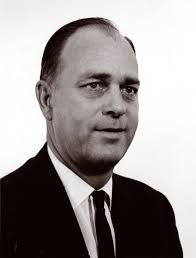
- Born: Morton Shelly Hilbert; January 3, 1917
- Died: December 24, 1998 (aged 81)
- Education: University of California, Berkeley; University of Michigan School of Public Health
- Occupations: Professor; environmentalist
- Known for: Co-founder of Earth Day
- Spouse: Stephanie Hilbert

Morton Shelly Hilbert (January 3, 1917 – December 24, 1998) was a professor of public health, environmentalist, and co-founder of Earth Day that was first celebrated on April 22, 1970. He is best known for developing public sanitation systems and sanitary public healthcare facilities throughout the United States, Europe, U.S. Virgin Islands, and developing nations.

As a dedicated and determined public health professional, Morton S. Hilbert worked towards the promotion and protection of environmental health. With the U.S. Public Health Service, Hilbert organized the Human Ecology Symposium in 1968. This forum helped to inform students about grave threats to environmental health in the 1960s and 1970s, and ultimately it inspired them to take action. In 1970 their efforts, along with a federal proclamation from U.S. Senator Gaylord Nelson, culminated in the observance of the first Earth Day.

== Education ==
In 1940, Hilbert graduated from the University of California, Berkeley, with a bachelor's degree in civil engineering and began his career as a public health official and field engineer in Michigan. He then enrolled in the University of Michigan School of Public Health, and in 1946 received his master's degree in Public Health.

== Career ==
=== Environmental health ===
For 18 years he was director of the Environmental Health Department for Wayne County in the Detroit, Michigan area. In 1954, he helped relocate one million refugees in Vietnam. In 1961, he returned to the University of Michigan as associate professor of environmental health. In 1968, Hilbert was appointed chairman of Environmental Health for the University of Michigan School of Public Health. The department eventually became Environmental and Industrial Health, and Hilbert was the first chairman.

From 1962 to 1969, he was the chairman of the board of the American Public Health Association. His reports address a range of environmental health issues such as care of laboratory animals, air pollution, and sanitation in hospitals. In 1968, he served as a member of President Richard Nixon's Task Force on Urban Problems.

=== Earth Day beginnings ===
In 1968, Hilbert and the U.S. Public Health Service organized the Human Ecology Symposium, an environmental conference for students to hear from scientists about the effects of environmental degradation on human health. For the next two years, Hilbert and students worked to plan the first Earth Day. Professor Hilbert worked with graduate students nationwide to develop increased interest and awareness about environmental issues. As a result of his efforts, the first "Earth Day" demonstration in the U.S. took place on The University of Michigan campus in March 1970, which was followed by similar events across the country. In the spring of 1970—along with a federal proclamation from U.S. Sen. Gaylord Nelson—the first Earth Day was held nationwide.

=== American Public Health Association ===
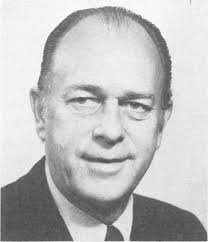

In 1975–76, Hilbert served as the first elected president of the American Public Health Association (APHA). He was elected president in 1976, and focused his tenure on promoting the importance of prevention, rather than corrective action, in managing environmental health. https://ajph.aphapublications.org/doi/pdf/10.2105/AJPH.66.1.99

=== Research ===
Spanning the several decades of his career, he authored numerous articles on sanitation, disease prevention, housing, and the environment. Through his consulting business, Hilbert worked in many different locations including the Virgin Islands, Thailand, Egypt, and Malaysia.

== Personal life ==
After retiring from the University of Michigan in 1986, Hilbert and his family moved to Brussels, Belgium, where Hilbert was director of the European Office of the National Sanitation Foundation. In 1992, he and his family moved to Bellevue, Washington.

=== Legacy ===
Hilbert is remembered by students, colleagues, and especially his family, who continue to honor his legacy. In 2008, his wife Stephanie Hilbert, daughters Barbara Kaier and Major Kathi Murray, (Ret.) and son Stephen Hilbert, were honored guests of the Dalai Lama at the Earth Day celebration in Ann Arbor. In 2010, Stephen was keynote speaker celebrating Earth Day at Cascadia College in Bothell, Washington.

Morton Hilbert's work can be viewed at the Bentley Historical Library at the University of Michigan. He is referenced in the history of conservation and environmentalism movements in Michigan. Recently, some have called for an increased awareness of Hilbert's role in the founding of Earth Day.

== See also ==
- Earth Day
- United States Public Health Service
