= ILS =

ILS or ils may refer to:

== Organizations ==
- ILS Law College, of the Indian Law Society
- Institute for Labor Studies, a Philippine policy research agency
- International Launch Services
- International Life Saving Federation
- International Lenin School
- Luigi Sturzo Institute

== Science and technology ==
- Instrument landing system, for aircraft
- Integrated library system, an enterprise resource planning system for libraries
- Iterated local search, in computing
- Integrated logistics support, in systems engineering

== Medicine ==
- Intermediate Life Support, a level of training in emergency/prehospital medical care

== Business and military ==
- Inventory Locator Service, LLC, a digital aviation warehouse company
- ILS (company), a Finnish engineering company

== Finance ==
- Insurance-Linked Securities (ILS)
- Israeli new shekel, ISO 4217 currency code

== Other uses ==
- Inscriptiones Latinae Selectae, a book of Latin inscriptions
- Ils (musician)
- Them (2006 film) (French: Ils), a French horror film
