= Bienvenido Laguesma =

Filipino politician, lawyer, businessman (born 1950)

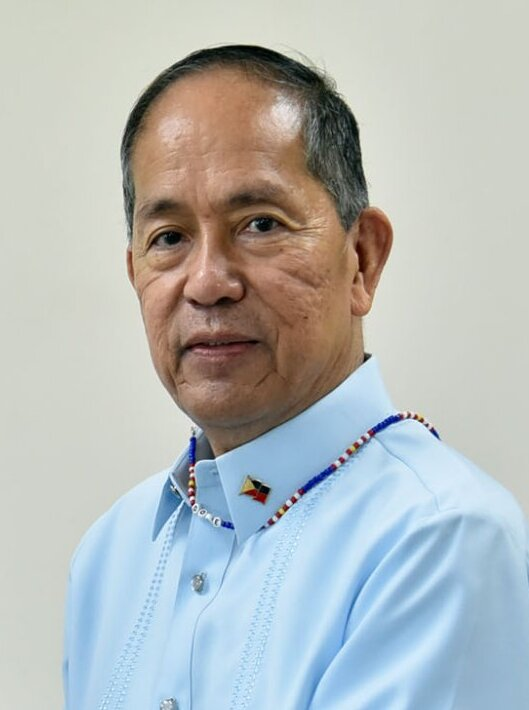
- Laguesma in 2022

25th and 31st Secretary of Labor and Employment
- In office June 30, 2022 – May 25, 2026
- President: Bongbong Marcos
- Preceded by: Silvestre Bello III
- Succeeded by: Francis Tolentino (Acting)
- In office June 30, 1998 – January 20, 2001
- President: Joseph Estrada
- Preceded by: Cresenciano Trajano (acting)
- Succeeded by: Patricia Santo Tomas

Undersecretary of Labor and Employment
- In office 1990–1996

Personal details
- Born: Bienvenido Estudillo Laguesma; October 3, 1950 (age 76) Santa Cruz, Manila, Philippines
- Education: Lyceum of the Philippines University (BA); Ateneo de Manila University (LLB)

Bienvenido Estudillo Laguesma (born October 3, 1950) is a Filipino government official, lawyer, and businessman who served as the 31st secretary of labor and employment under President Bongbong Marcos from 2022 to 2026, and previously as the 25th secretary under President Joseph Estrada from 1998 to 2001.

== Education ==
Laguesma was born on October 3, 1950, in Santa Cruz, Manila. He attended the Lyceum of the Philippines University where he obtained a bachelor's degree in political science in 1971. He then attended the Ateneo de Manila University where he graduated with a law degree in 1975. He entered the Royal Institute of Public Administration as a Colombo Scholar and took up an administration course in 1985. He also finished a CES Development Program at the Development Academy of the Philippines in 1984.

== Career ==
=== Government ===
Laguesma started working at the Ministry of Labor and Employment (now Department of Labor and Employment; DOLE) in the 1970s during the presidency of Ferdinand Marcos. Starting as a labor arbiter, he rose through the ranks within the ministry. He served as DOLE Undersecretary from 1990 to 1996 spanning the presidencies of Corazon Aquino and Fidel V. Ramos. From 1996 to 1998, Laguesma was Presidential Assistant for Ramos. He would then serve as Secretary of the Department of Labor and Employment from 1998 to 2001 during the administration of President Joseph Estrada.

He was also the commissioner of the Social Security System during President Benigno Aquino III's term.

He was offered to reprise his role as DOLE Secretary by president-elect Bongbong Marcos. He was initially reluctant, citing his age but later accepted Marcos' offer. He later resigned from the DOLE in May 2026 due to health reasons and was replaced by Francis Tolentino who was named as acting secretary.

=== Other ===
Laguesma runs his own private law firm and was the director of Philex Mining Corporation and the First Metro Investment Corporation.

Government offices
Preceded by Cresenciano Trajano; Acting	Secretary of Labor and Employment; 1998–2001	Succeeded by Patricia Santo Tomas
Preceded by Silvestre Bello III	Secretary of Labor and Employment; 2022–2026	Succeeded by Francis Tolentino (Acting)
