= Employees' Compensation Commission =

State agency of the Philippines

- Komisyon sa Pasahod sa mga Kawani

Agency overview
- Formed: March 17, 1975; 51 years ago
- Jurisdiction: Philippines
- Headquarters: ECC Building, 355 Sen. Gil Puyat Avenue, Makati City, Philippines
- Agency executives: Francis Tolentino, Chairperson; Kaima Via Velasquez, Executive Director
- Parent department: Department of Labor and Employment
- Website: www.ecc.gov.ph

The Employees' Compensation Commission (ECC; Filipino: Komisyon sa Pasahod sa mga Kawani) is a government agency of the Philippines attached to the Department of Labor and Employment that provides a package of compensation and benefits to public and private sector employees or their dependents in the event of work-connected sickness, injury, disability, or death. The commission formulates policies for the Employees' Compensation Program, reviews appealed claims, and champions occupational health and safety to ensure the overall well-being and security of the workforce.

The government officially created the commission on November 1, 1974 through the promulgation of Presidential Decree No. 442. The commission achieved full operational status on March 17, 1975 following the issuance of Presidential Decree No. 626. The commission manages the State Insurance Fund to maintain a viable financial reserve dedicated exclusively to worker benefits. The fundamental objective of the commission involves developing and implementing effective occupational safety and health policies to promote a healthy working population. The institutional framework protects members against adverse economic effects resulting from occupational contingencies by socializing the financial risks across all registered employers.

== History ==
=== Early framework and Direct employer liability ===
The Philippine legislature originally governed workmen compensation through Act No. 3428 in 1927. The government subsequently amended the legal system through Act No. 3812 to substitute specific phrasing regarding employment conditions and legal liabilities. The new civil code clarified employer obligations under Article 1711 to pay compensation even for fortuitous events outside direct employer negligence.

The state further expanded the regulatory system through Republic Act No. 772 in 1952. The revised legislative act specified tuberculosis as a compensable disease and adopted the rule that aggravation of a disease by the nature of employment warrants compensation. The law abolished the fellow servant rule previously abrogated by the civil code. The legislature introduced a broad presumption of compensability favoring workers through this specific amendment. The law presumed that claims fell within the protective provisions of the act unless employers presented substantial evidence to the contrary. The government experimented with this heavily employee oriented application for more than two decades to provide rapid relief to injured workers. The legislature eventually observed that the system destroyed the legal parity between the competing interests of employers and workers.

The old law imposed direct financial liability on individual employers for workplace injuries. The direct liability model created adversarial legal proceedings between workers seeking compensation and employers attempting to avoid unpredictable financial burdens. The resulting litigation backlog severely delayed the distribution of medical benefits to injured laborers.

=== Transition to Social insurance ===
President Ferdinand Marcos enacted Presidential Decree No. 442 on November 1, 1974 to establish a completely new compensation paradigm. The decree effectively created the commission and transformed the national approach to workplace injury resolution.

President Marcos subsequently issued Presidential Decree No. 626 to make the commission fully operational on January 1, 1975. The new legal instrument amended Title II of Book IV of the Labor Code regarding state insurance funds. The revised system abolished the legal presumption of compensability entirely to protect the financial stability of the program. The state shifted the financial compensation burden from individual employers to a centralized state managed social insurance fund.

== Legal mandate ==
=== Promulgation of the Labor Code ===
The Labor Code of the Philippines serves as the primary legal foundation for the operations of the commission. Article 166 of the Labor Code mandates the state to promote and develop a tax exempt employees compensation program. The statute dictates that employees and their dependents must promptly secure adequate income benefits and medical services in the event of work connected disability or death. The legislative framework established the commission as a policy making body rather than a direct claims processing office. The legal structure allows the commission to initiate and rationalize and coordinate the policies of the broader compensation program while other agencies handle the daily administrative tasks. The statute explicitly exempts the commission and the state insurance fund from standard government levies and taxes pursuant to Article 204 of the amended decree. The tax exemption ensures that all collected employer contributions flow directly toward worker rehabilitation and benefit distribution rather than general state revenue.

=== Policy formulation and coordination ===
The commission executes a distinct legal mandate focused on structural policy formulation rather than direct retail service. The commission formulates policies and guidelines for the continuous improvement of the compensation program. The board issues formal resolutions to expand coverage definitions and update the official list of compensable occupational diseases. The institution initiates programs directed toward adequate occupational health and accident prevention within various working environments. The organization acts as the central coordinating authority that standardizes the implementation procedures utilized by the separate administering agencies. The legal framework empowers the commission to adjust benefit structures and approve supplementary financial assistance programs during national emergencies.

=== Administration of the State Insurance Fund ===
The State Insurance Fund serves as the primary financial reservoir supporting all approved compensation claims. The system requires employers to remit regular financial contributions based on the specific salary brackets of their registered employees. The covered workers do not contribute any personal wages to this specialized insurance pool.

The legal mandate tasks the commission with managing the fund to ensure long term viability and strong financial returns. The law restricts the utilization of the fund strictly to worker benefits and approved administrative overhead. The statute requires all revenues collected by the administering agencies to be deposited directly into the state insurance fund. The system accumulates all revenues not needed to meet current operational expenses into this distinct fund. The commission receives an annual corporate operating budget charged directly against the fund to maintain its administrative functions. The statutory budget cannot exceed four percent of the twelve percent loading fund calculated from the total assets and earnings of the preceding year.

The scheme required employers to pay regular premium contributions into the State Insurance Fund instead of facing direct litigation from injured employees. The Labor Code intended to restore equilibrium between the obligation of employers to pay compensation and the right of employees to receive prompt medical reparation. The injured employee no longer needed to litigate against an employer in civil court to secure disability benefits. The adversarial nature of compensation claims ceased because employers no longer opposed compensation requests directly as individual defendants. The claimant simply files a formal request with the administering agencies to access the trust fund upon sustaining an injury.

=== Benefit package framework ===
The commission oversees a complete and comprehensive package of benefits and services for workers and their dependents. The program provides loss of income benefits for workers unable to report to work due to illness or injury. The system provides medical services and appliances and supplies to facilitate physical recovery.

The benefit package includes a carers allowance for workers suffering permanent disabilities requiring constant assistance. The program includes complete rehabilitation services for occupationally disabled workers. The system grants death benefits and funeral benefits to the legal beneficiaries of a deceased worker. The beneficiaries fall into primary and secondary categories determined at the time of the death of the employee. The primary beneficiaries include the legitimate spouse living with the employee at the time of death until the spouse remarries. The primary category includes legitimate and legitimated and legally adopted and acknowledged natural children. The children must be unmarried and not gainfully employed and not over twenty one years of age. The rules allow children over twenty one years of age to receive benefits if they are incapacitated and incapable of self support due to physical or mental defects acquired during minority. The primary beneficiaries hold priority claim to death benefits over secondary beneficiaries. The system prohibits the payment of death benefits to secondary beneficiaries whenever primary beneficiaries exist. The secondary beneficiaries include legitimate descendants and illegitimate children meeting the same age and capacity requirements.

=== Filing procedures and Quasi-judicial appellate functions ===
The rules require claimants to file compensation claims within a strict three year prescriptive period. The three year period begins from the time the employee was unable to report for work in cases of sickness. The prescriptive period begins from the time of the incident in cases of injury. The period begins from the date of death in cases involving workplace fatalities. The claimant may file the application at the regional office of the administering system nearest to the place of work or residence. The claimant receives payments directly from the respective agency upon approval. The claimant possesses the right to file a request for reconsideration with the main office of the system if the initial claim fails. The claimant gains the legal right to elevate the case to the commission through a letter of appeal only after the system denies the internal reconsideration request.

The commission reviews and decides upon all compensation claims officially disapproved by the primary administering agencies. The commission operates as an appellate body with quasi judicial powers to evaluate the medical evidence and legal arguments presented by the appellant. The commission holds the authority to reverse the denials issued by the administering agencies and order the immediate release of benefits. The claimant retains the option to appeal adverse commission decisions directly to the Court of Appeals under the established rules of civil procedure.

== Governance Structure and Administration ==
=== Board of Commissioners ===
The formal governing body directing the agency is the Board of Commissioners. The board consists of five ex-officio members representing various government institutions and two appointive members representing the private sector. The Secretary of Labor and Employment acts as the permanent chairman of the board to ensure alignment with national labor policies. The General Manager of the Government Service Insurance System and the Administrator of the Social Security System hold permanent voting seats. The Chairman of the Philippine Health Insurance Corporation and the Executive Director of the commission secretariat complete the ex officio roster. The Philippine Health Insurance Corporation replaced the former Philippine Medical Care Commission in this capacity.

The President of the Philippines appoints one representative for private employers and one representative for labor employees to serve fixed terms on the board. The board reviews and approves all corporate financial statements before submission to state auditors. The commissioners deliberate and vote upon the policy resolutions that govern the entire compensation program.

=== Administering agencies ===
The commission relies on two primary administering agencies to process initial claims and manage the physical collection of funds. The Government Service Insurance System handles all compensation claims originating from public sector employees and government workers. The Social Security System processes all claims submitted by private sector workers. The separation of administrative duties allows the commission to focus entirely on policy development and appellate reviews rather than localized document processing. The administering agencies hold the responsibility to enforce the collection of premiums from employers across the country. The commission maintains its primary registered office along Senator Gil J. Puyat Avenue in Makati City to oversee these inter agency operations.

=== Occupational Safety and Health Center ===
President Corazon Aquino issued Executive Order No. 307 on November 4, 1987 to establish the Occupational Safety and Health Center. The executive order placed the center directly under the administrative umbrella of the commission. The center functions as the recognized national authority for specialized research and training concerning workplace safety protocols. The facility conducts mandatory safety training and comprehensive safety audits for various industries. The center operates from a separate government facility located along North Avenue corner Agham Road in Diliman, Quezon City.

== Governance ==
=== KaGabay Rehabilitation Program ===
The commission implements specific intervention programs to assist occupationally disabled workers in returning to productive civilian life. The primary intervention vehicle is the Katulong at Gabay sa Manggagawang may Kapansanan (KaGabay) program. The program provides targeted economic assistance for workers who lost regular employment due to severe work related sickness or injury. The initiative prioritizes physical restoration through the provision of free physical therapy and occupational therapy sessions. The commission purchases and distributes necessary medical appliances and customized assistive devices to qualified beneficiaries. The program requires participants to hold approved disability benefits to qualify for the special assistance.

The commission expands the assistance significantly beyond basic medical recovery to include comprehensive vocational training. The program funds skills training programs to help disabled workers acquire new competencies necessary to reenter the labor force. The commission offers intensive entrepreneurship seminars for individuals suffering disabilities that render them incapable of returning to traditional corporate employment. The commission partners actively with the Department of Trade and Industry to provide specialized business management training.

The joint initiative helps disabled workers establish independent small businesses to successfully return to the economic mainstream. The partner department sends business counselors to advise participants on choosing ventures based on local opportunities and personal interests. The representatives educate the participants on their rights as workers and methods to uplift their lives through entrepreneurial activities.

=== Quick Response Team initiatives ===
The commission operates a specialized Quick Response Team Program to provide immediate intervention during workplace crises. The program extends professional psycho social counseling and critical stress debriefing services to victims and their surviving families following sudden occupational accidents or workplace fatalities. The deployed personnel actively assist grieving families in processing the complex documentary requirements necessary for filing compensation claims. The team provides detailed information regarding the rights and privileges available under the compensation program. The intervention model facilitates the prompt release of initial benefits from the administering agencies by ensuring all paperwork is perfectly compliant prior to submission. The initiative serves as a practical support system for workers facing the sudden onset of occupational diseases.

=== Telecommuting and Remote Work compensability ===
The global shift toward remote work exposed a regulatory gap in traditional occupational compensation frameworks. The traditional legal definition of a recognized workplace heavily favored physical office locations strictly controlled by employers. The commission recognized the immediate need to protect employees transitioning to alternative work arrangements during the recent health crisis.

The board of commissioners approved Board Resolution No. 21-03-09 on March 11, 2021 to resolve this legal ambiguity. The landmark resolution established a clear legal policy regarding the compensability of disability or death resulting from injuries sustained while working from home. The policy covers all registered employees operating within both the public and private sectors.

The administrative framework requires a formal written directive from the employer requiring the specific work from home arrangement to qualify for the benefits. The employee must sustain the injury while actively discharging official duties within the specified working hours at their residence. The claimant bears the legal burden of proving that the incident occurred strictly during the performance of assigned professional tasks. The policy aligns directly with the worker protection objectives outlined in Republic Act No. 11165, also known as the Telecommuting Act.

The Department of Labor and Employment issued Department Order No. 237 in 2022 to categorically state that work performed in an alternative workplace qualifies as work performed in the regular workplace. The commission successfully adapted rigid social insurance structures to accommodate modern employment realities through this specific resolution. The executive director stated publicly that remote workers remain exposed to significant injury related incidents despite remaining in their respective private residences. The commission ensured through this regulatory update that the compensation program remains entirely relevant and responsive to changing technological environments.

=== COVID-19 Pandemic response ===
The commission implemented regulatory changes to address the unprecedented threat posed by the coronavirus pandemic. The board issued Board Resolution No. 21-04-14 to officially include the viral infection in the master list of compensable occupational and work related diseases. The inclusion successfully bypassed the lengthy legal process of proving increased risk for front line workers seeking immediate medical relief. The commission extended formal coverage to include adverse medical reactions or death resulting directly from employer mandated inoculations.

The commission disbursed substantial supplementary financial assistance to affected workers during the peak of the crisis. The administering agencies released over two billion six hundred million pesos in emergency benefits covering hundreds of thousands of individual claims. The system provided more than ₱450 million specifically to seventy seven thousand workers who contracted work connected infections. The commission authorized a special one time top up cash assistance grant of ₱30,000 for private sector claimants suffering from confirmed infections. The commission provided additional financial assistance of ten thousand pesos to regular pensioners to mitigate pandemic induced economic hardships resulting from broad societal lockdowns. The total financial assistance for pensioners reached five hundred forty one million pesos granted to twenty seven thousand qualified beneficiaries. The commission passed eight major policies in a single year to safeguard families from severe financial difficulties.

=== Digitalization and Public outreach programs ===
The organization accelerated critical digitalization efforts by launching an artificial intelligence chatbot named ECCAI to handle the massive surge in public inquiries. The commission integrated the digital utility into its social media accounts and primary website. The digital tool allowed the commission to conduct online advocacy seminars reaching nearly forty eight thousand workers while physical government offices remained closed. The system answers basic queries regarding claim status and eligibility criteria without requiring human intervention. The commission deployed human information officers to monitor complex queries generated by the automated system to ensure accurate public guidance. The social media platforms of the agency garnered added followers due to these aggressive information campaigns.

The commission lifted the standard three year prescriptive period suspension for filing claims to accommodate individuals unable to process paperwork due to pandemic travel restrictions. The board approved Board Resolution No. 26-03-08 to execute a specific data sharing agreement with the Social Security System. The resolution directs the administering agency to collect and share personal information of claimants to expedite electronic verification processes.

== Legal principles and Jurisprudence ==
=== Protecting the integrity of the Trust Fund ===
The judicial system consistently prioritizes the long term solvency of the trust fund over individual claims lacking sufficient evidentiary support. The courts warn routinely that paying unqualified claimants would severely endanger the ability of the system to compensate legitimate workplace injuries in the future. The fund represents a collective resource designed to protect millions of covered workers against catastrophic accidents. The strict adherence to the list of occupational diseases prevents the fund from acting as a general health insurance provider for common ailments completely unrelated to industrial hazards.

=== Evidentiary standards and Substantial proof ===
The legal system requires claimants to provide substantial evidence rather than absolute definitive medical certainty to succeed in an appeal. Substantial evidence consists of relevant documentation that a reasonable mind might accept as entirely adequate to form a rational conclusion. The Labor Code demands a reasonable connection between the illness and the working conditions rather than a perfect scientific causal relation.

The claimant must show that the nature of the work exposed them to specific hazards beyond the ordinary risks of daily living. The presentation of basic medical certificates confirming an illness exists does not satisfy the burden of proof regarding occupational causation. The claimant must submit specialized medical assessments detailing how the specific occupational environment contributed materially to the development of the condition.

The Supreme Court ruled in the ABS-CBN case and the Luzon Development Bank case that the commission operates as a quasi judicial agency whose decisions hold legal weight. The decisions of the commission are appealable to the Court of Appeals under Rule forty three of the Rules of Court. The procedural rules require appellants to attach certified true copies of the resolutions and complete medical records to avoid outright dismissal of their petitions.

The court dismissed the petition in the Tua case because the claimant failed to attach the required medical records proving the work related nature of diabetes mellitus.

=== Abolition of compensability presumptions ===
On June 30, 1980, the Supreme Court abolished of the presumption of compensability originally mandated by Presidential Decree No. 626. The judicial case of Raro versus Employees Compensation Commission established that modern claimants must provide positive medical proof linking their specific illness to their working conditions. The court ruled that institutional sympathy for sick claimants cannot legally override the strict evidentiary requirements codified in the law. The justices reiterated this foundational principle in Sarmiento versus Employees Compensation Commission by emphasizing the absolute necessity of balancing worker rights against the financial integrity of the state insurance fund. The previous framework allowed claims to succeed simply by demonstrating that an injury occurred during working hours. The current legal standard requires a scientific link between the occupational hazard and the resulting disability.

=== Defining Occupational diseases and Increased risk ===
The courts adjudicate complex medical disputes regarding specific unlisted diseases. The legal framework provides two distinct paths for medical compensability. The first path involves demonstrating that the sickness is a direct result of an occupational disease explicitly listed under Annex A of the amended rules. The second path requires the claimant to present evidence proving that the risk of contracting the unlisted disease was significantly increased by the working conditions.

The case of Ibarra versus Government Service Insurance System involved a bank attorney claiming compensation for retinal detachment. The commission denied the claim because the claimant failed to prove a history of workplace trauma or specific working conditions directly increasing the risk of the specialized eye ailment.

The Supreme Court upheld the denial of benefits for a police officer who died of hepatocellular carcinoma in the case of Liwanag.The claimant failed to establish a direct causal relation between routine administrative police duties and the contraction of the viral liver disease. The Supreme Court ruled in the case of Sulit that illnesses like acute pyelonephritis and bronchopneumonia suffered by a mechanic were not occupational diseases. The court upheld the denial of the claim because the widow failed to prove that the mechanical duties directly caused the fatal conditions. The court denied death benefits in the Lorenzo case because leukemia was listed as a compensable disease only among operating room personnel exposed to anesthetics. The claimant failed to prove that the risk of contracting leukemia was increased by the specific working conditions of the deceased spouse.

== Audit findings and administrative challenges ==
=== Modular workstation procurement dispute ===
The commission experienced legal controversy regarding the specific procurement of office furniture during a facility upgrade. The Commission on Audit issued a formal notice of disallowance against the agency for a contract exceeding ₱3 million involving modular workstations. The state auditors determined that the agency blatantly violated government procurement laws by utilizing direct contracting instead of mandatory public bidding. The commission purchased the expensive workstations from a supplier claiming exclusive distributorship rights without properly verifying the necessity of the specific brand. The internal recommendation relied entirely on a technical working group report favoring the single supplier.

The auditors noted that the final purchase cost heavily exceeded initial budget estimates drafted by the internal architect which only amounted to ₱2 million. The commission allocated budget funds derived from building rental income for the acquisition despite explicit instructions from the Department of Budget and Management restricting rental income strictly to building maintenance. The internal management proceeded to delete the workstation item from the proposed special budget but executed the purchase regardless. The supplier received a fifteen percent advance payment in direct violation of government auditing codes prohibiting advance payments for undelivered goods. The commission failed to require any performance security or retention fee from the private contractor to protect government interests.

The resulting legal battle extended for over a decade and eventually reached the Supreme Court. The court eventually exonerated specific administrative personnel like Irene Rosario due to a proven lack of personal bad faith. The controversy highlighted massive systemic weaknesses in the internal procurement protocols of the agency. The legal director of the corporate adjudication office disallowed the payment and held the executive director and certifying officers personally liable for the transaction. The Commission on Audit later affirmed the notice of disallowance and reinstated the liability of the remaining officers at a reduced amount.

=== Dormant receivables and Financial irregularities ===
The state auditors discovered millions of pesos in dormant receivable accounts during consecutive annual financial reviews. The commission failed to maintain proper supporting documents to prove the legal validity of financial obligations owed by various officers and employees. The outstanding receivables remained uncollected for extended periods without aggressive legal enforcement from management. The due from officers and employees account totaled more than ₱5 million representing over fifty percent of the total account balance. The auditing body recommended that management exhaust all legal measures to document the dormant accounts and send immediate demand letters to all concerned debtors to enforce collection. The auditors noted persistent issues regarding the accurate valuation of property and equipment. The state accountants demanded the commission issue a formal policy on the appraisal and revaluation of assets to properly determine changes in fair values. The continuous inability of the agency to immediately enforce these specific audit recommendations resulted in modified opinions on supplementary financial information in previous auditing cycles. The commission subsequently improved financial reporting frameworks to achieve an unmodified opinion from the Commission on Audit in succeeding years. The unmodified opinion represents the highest audit rating given by the state auditors. The auditors confirmed that the financial statements presented the financial position of the agency fairly and accurately.
