= Saidamen Pangarungan =

Filipino businessman, lawyer, and politician (born 1950)

Sultan Saidamen Pangarungan
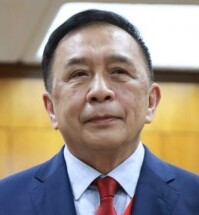

Chairman of the Commission on Elections
- Ad interim
- In office March 8, 2022 – June 3, 2022
- President: Rodrigo Duterte
- Preceded by: Sheriff Abas
- Succeeded by: George Garcia

Secretary of the National Commission on Muslim Filipinos
- In office July 9, 2018 – March 8, 2022
- President: Rodrigo Duterte
- Preceded by: Yasmin Busran Lao
- Succeeded by: Guiling "Gene" A. Mamondiong

Governor of Lanao del Sur
- In office 1988 – June 30, 1992
- Preceded by: Tarhata Alonto-Lucman
- Succeeded by: Mahid Mutilan
- In office March 1986 – September 1986
- Preceded by: Mohammad Ali Dimaporo
- Succeeded by: Tarhata Alonto-Lucman

Member of the ARMM Regional Legislative Assembly
- In office 1979–1982

Personal details
- Born: Saidamen Balt Pangarungan; September 23, 1950 (age 76) Dansalan, Lanao, Philippines (now Marawi)
- Party: PDP–Laban (2001); Lakas (1995–2001); LDP (1988–1995)
- Education: San Beda College
- Occupation: Businessman and politician
- Profession: Lawyer

Saidamen Balt Pangarungan (born September 23, 1950) is a Filipino businessman, lawyer and politician who previously served as the ad interim Chairman of the Commission on Elections from March–June 2022. He previously served as the secretary of the National Commission on Muslim Filipinos in the Duterte administration, and was the governor of Lanao del Sur from 1986 and again from 1988 to 1992.

== Education and work ==
He studied at the Jamiatul Philippine al-Islamia (Islamic University of the Philippines) in Marawi City, where he was a consistent valedictorian in his elementary and high school years in 1956–1966. He finished his Liberal Arts degree in 1971 and Law in 1976 at the San Beda College as a consistent college scholar. He passed the Philippine bar examinations the same year with a weighted average of 85.6%.

He immediately went to law practice with the prestigious Siguion-Reyna, Montecillo & Ongsiako law offices in Makati City until 1984, where he became a legal counsel of both local and multi-national companies in the Philippines such as Bank of America, Goodyear, Caltex, Sumitomo, Dole Philippines, San Miguel Corp., PLDT, Philippine Airlines, and Equitable PCI Bank (now BDO).

== Political career ==
As an opposition candidate against the ruling Kilusang Bagong Lipunan (KBL), Pangarungan was elected Assemblyman of then Central Mindanao from 1979 to 1982.

After the EDSA revolution in 1986, Pangarungan was appointed acting governor of Lanao del Sur, replacing governor Mohammad Ali Dimaporo, a powerful ally of then President Ferdinand Marcos during the martial law regime.

=== Saving 12 Carmelite Nuns ===
A challenge to his administration was the kidnapping of 12 Carmelite nuns from their Marawi hilltop convent by lawless group of men. From the Vatican, Pope John Paul II appealed to their captors to release the nuns who were later brought to Lumbayanague across south of Lake Lanao. After two weeks of continued search, Pangarungan led government security forces encircled the kidnappers' holdout. Under heavy pressure, the outnumbered kidnappers were forced to release all the nuns, safe and unharmed.

=== Abolition of 2,000 ghost barangays ===
Pangarungan was later appointed as undersecretary of Department of Interior and Local Government by President Corazon Aquino. He was tasked as chairman of the inter-agency committee that investigated the ghost barangays in the Muslim provinces. After 6 months of ocular investigations and upon his recommendations, President Aquino signed an executive order abolishing some 2,000 ghost barangays in the two Lanao provinces, saving the government billions of pesos in regular allotments to the non-existent or uninhabited villages. As undersecretary, he also helped craft an executive order granting regular salaries and allowances to barangay (village) officials in the country.

=== Governor ===
In the 1988 elections, he was elected governor of Lanao del Sur, beating the political dynasties in the province. As governor, he built the 4-hectare provincial capitol complex overlooking the scenic Lake Lanao, the provincial library, People's Park and commissioned other infrastructure projects. He also concreted 110 kilometers of two major road networks: the Lake Lanao circumferential road and the Marawi-Malabang Road. At that time, the internal revenue allotment (IRA) of the provincial government was a meager P850,000 a month compared to the P160 million monthly at 2017 figures.

During Pangarungan's watch, the province was drug-free because of his staunch campaign against illegal drugs trade. Under his governorship, Lanao del Sur and its capital was much peaceful, with no recorded firefights or skirmishes between government and rebel forces. He negotiated the surrender of thousands of MNLF and MILF rebels. For his unprecedented achievements, Pangarungan was awarded thrice as one of the "Most Outstanding Governors of the Philippines" in three consecutive years: 1989, 1990 and 1991.

=== Peacemaker ===
Pangarungan was also a member of the Philippine delegation at the World Muslim Congress in Karachi, Pakistan in 1983, where he sponsored the adoption of the 'Karachi Declaration for Peace & Unity' to revive the long stalled peace talks between the Marcos government and the rebel MNLF and BMLO forces. The delegation included Senators Acmad Domocao Alonto, Salipada Pendatun, speakers Uttoh Ututalum and Abulkhayr Alonto, Court of Appeals justice Mama Busran and Princess Tarhata Lucman. In 1987, President Cory Aquino sent Senators Aquilino Pimentel Jr., Agapito Butz Aquino, Norberto Gonzales and Pangarungan to the Organization of Islamic Conference in Jeddah, Saudi Arabia to revive the peace talks with the MNLF- Nur Misuari faction. This led to the signing of the Jeddah Accord of 1987. Nur Misuari ended his exile and returned to the Philippines to eventually sign the 1996 Final Peace Accord with the government.

=== Mindanao power crisis ===
In 2007, he became President of the Agus 3 Hydropower Corporation; and later in 2013 as chairman/CEO of the Maranao Energy Corp.(MENCO) that won the government bid on the Agus 3 hydropower project (240 Megawatts) in 2015. Pangarungan pursued the Agus 3 project to help address the crippling power outages in Mindanao in 2010 to 2015.

=== Enthronement as a sultan ===
He was enthroned Sultan of the Sultanate of Madaya, Marawi City on July 5, 2009, attended by 12,000 dignitaries and guests.

=== Secretary, National Commission on Muslim Filipinos ===
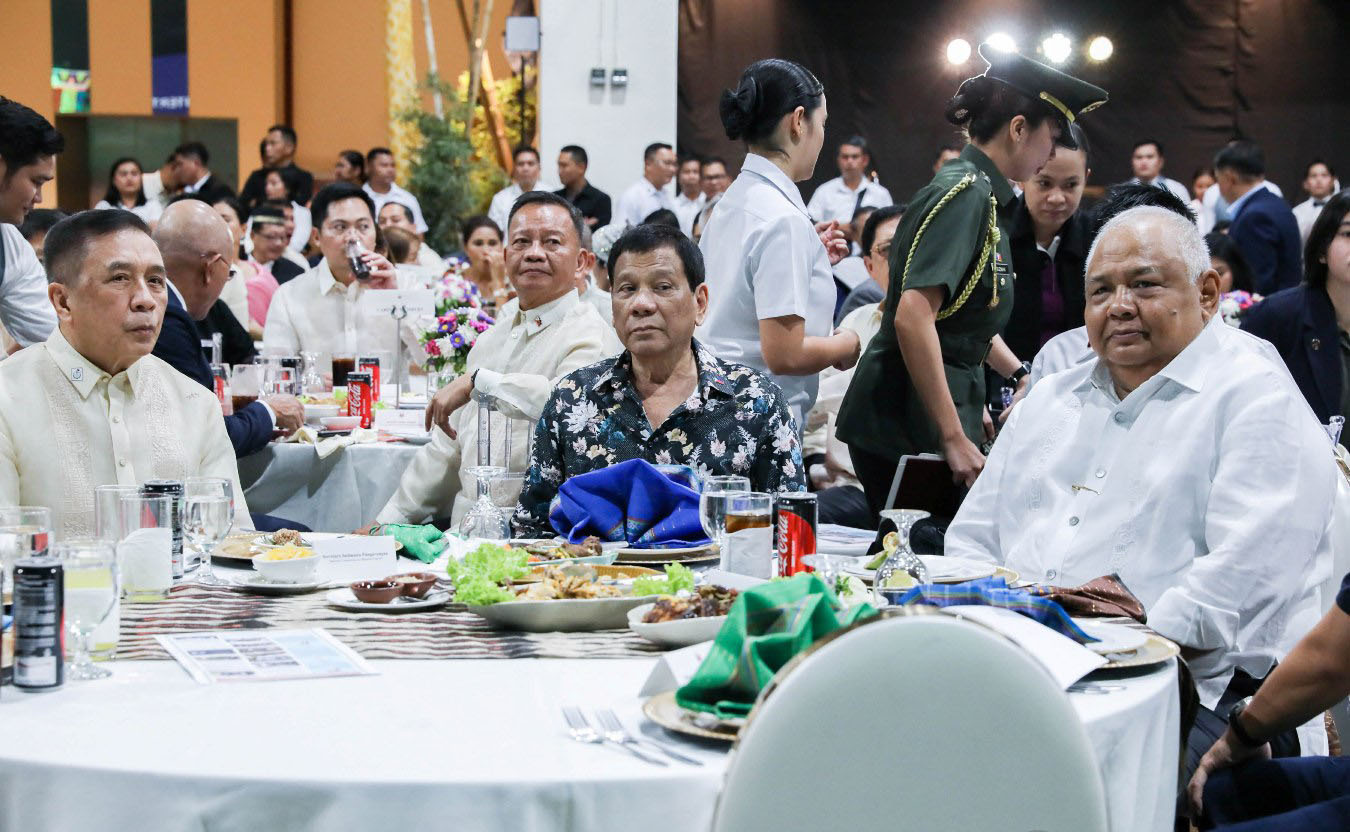
Pangarungan (leftmost) with President Duterte (center) and Executive Secretary Salvador Medialdea (rightmost) during the 2019 Eid al-Fitr Celebration.

On July 9, 2018, President Rodrigo Duterte appointed Pangarungan as secretary with cabinet rank and chairman, National Commission on Muslim Filipinos (NCMF). Under its charter, Republic Act 9997, the commission is tasked to uplift the socio-economic and cultural lives of the approximately 8 million Muslims in the Philippines. Pangarungan's priority agenda was to reform the NCMF long dogged by corruption, ensure a comfortable and affordable annual Hajj (Pilgrimage) to Makkah, Saudi Arabia for thousands of Filipino pilgrims, and led a joint nationwide project with the United Nation Development Program (UNDP) and the Japanese Government in strengthening national and local resilience against violent extremism. Pangarungan launched the project at the Mindanao State University in Marawi City on January 23, 2019 in time with the twin explosions in a cathedral in Jolo, Sulu that killed twenty parishioners and 111 wounded. Three days later, a grenade explosion rocked a mosque in Zamboanga City that killed 2 imams and wounding 4 others. These violent incidents were widely condemned by Muslim and Christian leaders in the country.

=== ISO 9001:2015 Seal of Excellence Certification ===
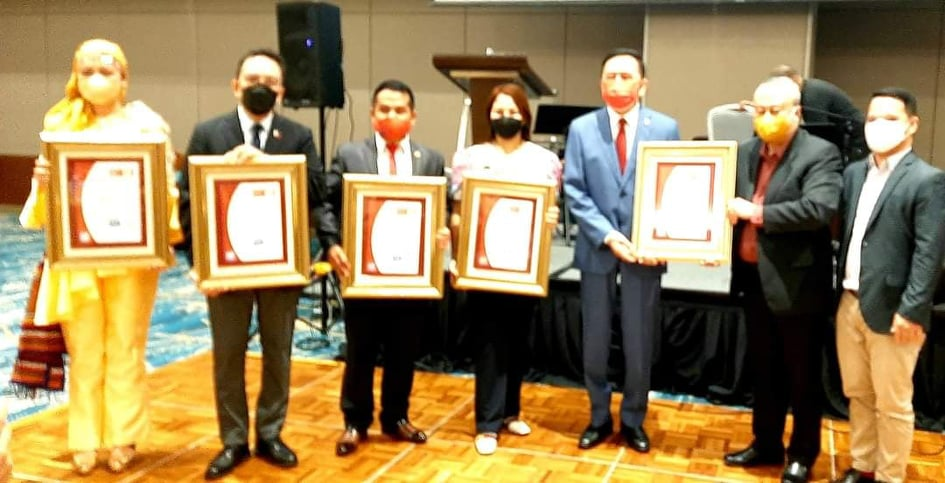
NCMF under Pangarungan leadership, received ISO 9001:2015 Seal of Excellence Certification

Under Pangarungan leadership, the NCMF received ISO 9001:2015 Seal of Excellence Certification by Bureau Veritas of France on December 16, 2021. This was in recognition of his accomplishments in reforming the Hajj pilgrimage by providing the best accommodation to thousands of Filipino pilgrims in 4.7 to 5-star hotels in Saudi Arabia; in reducing the Mutawiff or Hajj service fees by substantial reduction in plane fares. Pangarungan also activated and implemented the 24 mandates of the Commission under its NCMF charter including national peace-building, the development to greater heights of halal, shariah, Islamic finance, and the Madrasah educational system. He proactively responded to the challenges of the COVID-19 pandemic through the Commission's ongoing relief operations and other assistance to the calls for help by more than 200,000 muslim families nationwide.

=== Chairman, Commission on Elections ===
On March 7, 2022, Pangarungan was appointed by President Rodrigo Duterte as ad-interim Chairman, Commission on Elections with a term of seven years until February 2, 2029. With barely two months to prepare for the May 9, 2022 National and Local Elections, Pangarungan and the other Commissioners geared up preparations.

=== Fastest Results, Honest and Peaceful Elections ===
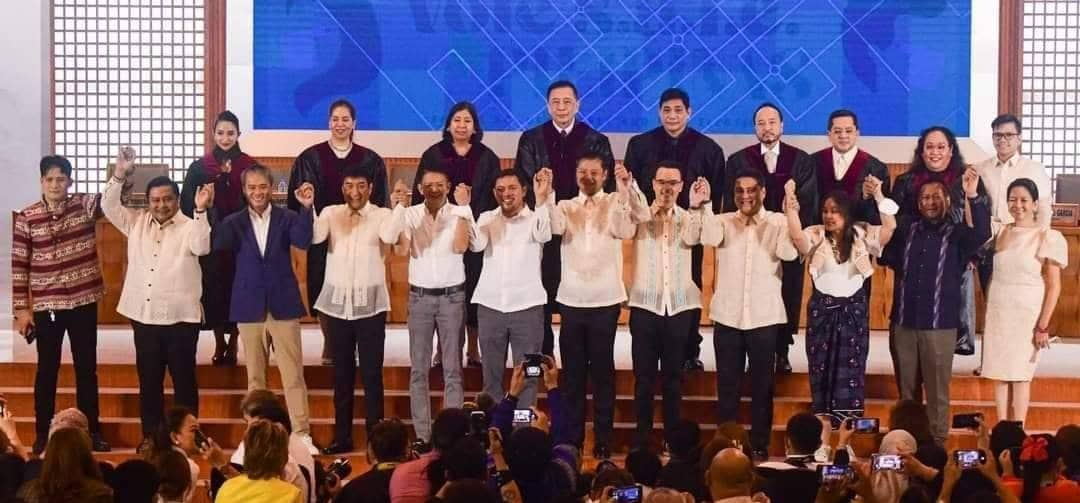
COMELEC Chairman Pangarungan with the newly elected Senators

The election was hailed by foreign and local observers as the fastest in Philippine history with the results transmitted in the Comelec Transparency Server before midnight of election day. Its voter turnout of 83.11% was the highest in Philippine election history. It was also the most peaceful election with only 27 incidents of violence compared to 166 violent incidents in the 2019 polls and 133 incidents during the 2016 elections. This was due to the series of peace-covenant signings among candidates in election hotspots that Pangarungan initiated across the country. Proclaimed swiftly in record time were the winning candidates for President [Ferdinand “Bongbong” Marcos Jr.], Vice President [Sara Z. Duterte], Senators and Party-list. In a national survey by Pulse Asia, the prevailing sentiment of Filipinos at 82% is one of trust that the outcome of the recent national and local elections is accurate and credible. Satisfaction with the automated voting system, which employed the use of vote counting machines (VCMs) was expressed by 89% of Filipinos.

The bicameral Commission on Appointments of the 18th Congress however failed to act on the appointment of Pangarungan and other Commissioners of the Comelec, Commission on Audit and Civil Service Commission for lack of quorum leading to the bypass of their appointments.

== Personal life, family and ancestry ==
He is married to Princess Johayra Diamond Ali Pacasum Pangarungan, the Bailabi a Gaus sa Ranao and former assemblywoman of ARMM. Pangarungan was born in Marawi City on September 23, 1950, to Datu Abdulrahman Diambangan Balt of the Sultanate of Bayang, and the late Bae Jameela Asum Pangarungan Amai Manabilang of the Sultanate of Lanao and the Sultanate of Madaya.

Pangarungan came from a line of great ancestors. His paternal great-grandfather Sultan Pandapatan of Bayang led Maranaw resistance against the American forces stationed in Malabang, Lanao del Sur, under Colonel Frank Baldwin with 600 soldiers composed of the 27th Infantry, 15th Cavalry under the command of Captain Pershing and 25th Battery of Fields.

Colonel Baldwin initiated the attack of Bayang in retaliation to the murder of two soldiers in Malabang for the snatching of the soldiers' Krag rifles. The Battle of Padang Karbala in Bayang took place in Cotta Pandapatan on May 2, 1902, conceded to be the fiercest battle ever fought by the superior American forces in the Philippines. This historic battle which left Bayang as the "land of the widows and orphans" claimed the lives of 300 Maranaw fighters including Sultan Pandapatan and death of 11 American soldiers that included Lt. Thomas Vicars and wounding severely 40 other soldiers. Pershing was never present in the battlefield of Cotta Pandapatan, he was busy convincing, thru diplomacy and negotiations, other sultans and Datus not to support and go with Sultan Pandapatan, who openly and in writing, declared resistance to the American forces. Had it not for Pershing's peaceful efforts, The Battle of Bayang could have escalated to a war between all the Maranaws against the Americans. President Roosevelt furiously disliked the attack of Baldwin on Bayang and prompted Major General Adna Chaffe, US Philippine Dapartment commander, to designate Capt Pershing as new commander of 27th infantry Regiment, 15th Cavalry, and 25th Battery, whose new camp named "Camp Vicars" was establiblished near Binidayan and Bayang two days after the Battle of Bayang. Pershing's diplomatic and military skills before and after his Mindanao tour of duty prompted President Roosevelt to promote Pershing to colonel, but seniority in US Army prevailed and only the ranks of Generals are subject to presidential control, Roosevelt assigned Pershing in Tokyo as Military Attache in 1905, and that same year, Roosevelt convinced the US Congress and promoted Pershing to Brigadier General.

Sultan Saidamen Pangarungan's maternal great grandfather is Datu Amai Manabilang Didato who led Muslim leaders signed the "1935 Dansalan Declaration" urging the US Congress for the exclusion of Muslim lands in Mindanao in the grant of Philippine independence, so that at a later transition period the United States can grant a separate independence for Mindanao under Muslim rule. Datu Amai Manabilang then envisioned the U.S. granting a separate Muslim homeland in Mindanao and avoid a separatist war in Mindanao in the future as what happened four decades later. The Moro insurgency started by the MNLF in Marawi city in 1971 has claimed some 120,000 lives, mostly Muslims and more than 10,000 government troops. It displaced some 500,000 Muslim Filipinos as refugees to Sabah, Malaysia.

As an alternative to secession, Pangarungan however advocated "unity in diversity" thru a substantive and meaningful autonomy to Muslim Mindanao. Pangarungan was a governor of Lanao del Sur when the province voted to join the Autonomous Region in Muslim Mindanao (ARMM) during the 1989 plebiscite on the ARMM Organic Act 14.

Political offices
Preceded by Mohammad Ali Dimaporo	Governor of Lanao del Sur; 1988-1992	Succeeded by Saaduddin Alauya
Preceded by Yasmin Busran Lao	Secretary of the National Commission on Muslim Filipinos; 2018-2022	Succeeded by Guiling "Gene" A. Mamondiong
Preceded by Sheriff Abas	Chairman of the Commission on Elections; Ad interim 2022	Succeeded by George Erwin M. Garcia
