= George Garcia =

Chairman of the Commission on Elections since 2022

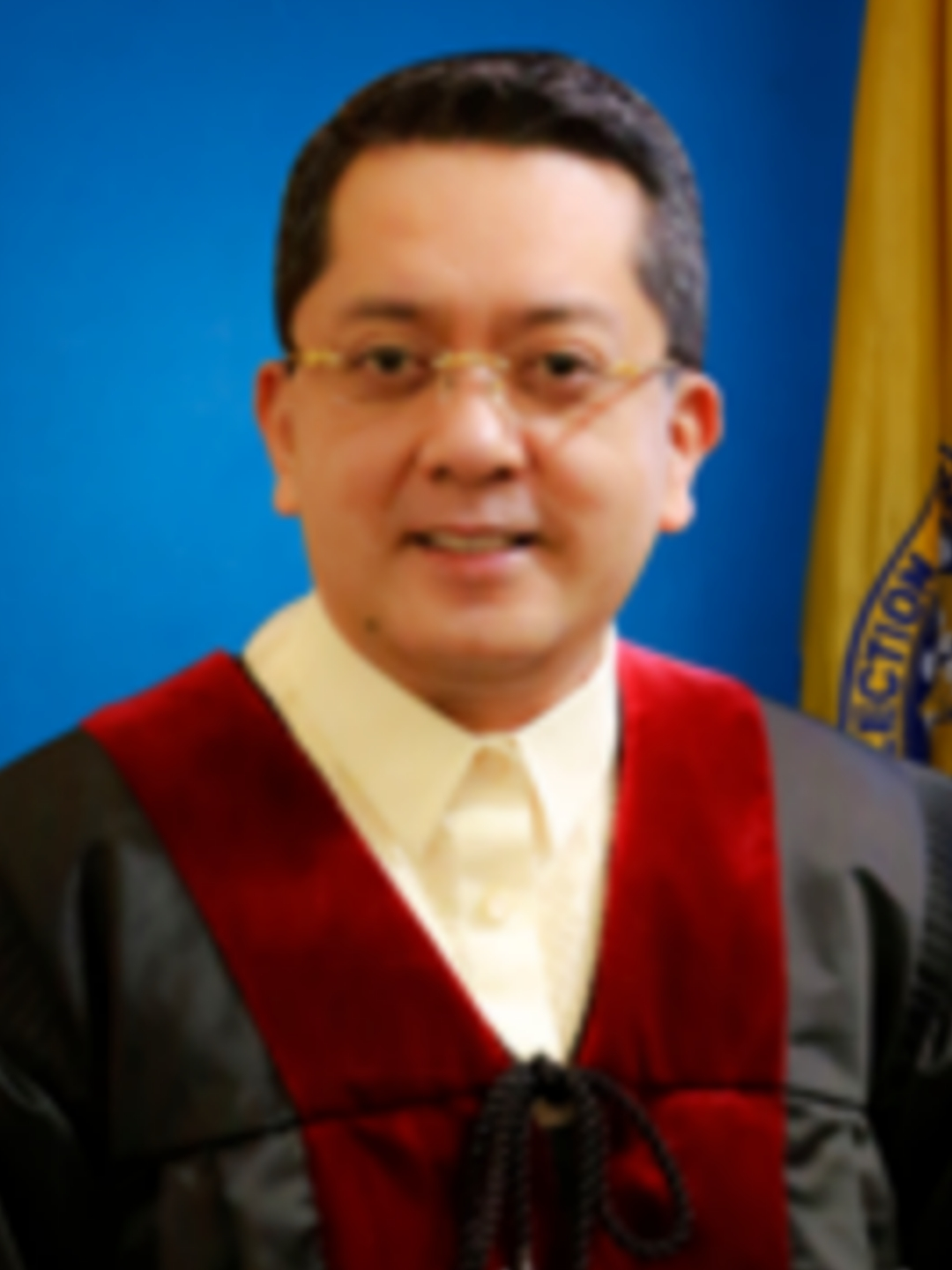
- Official portrait, 2022

Chairperson of the Commission on Elections
- Incumbent
- Assumed office July 22, 2022
- President: Bongbong Marcos
- Preceded by: Saidamen Pangarungan (ad interim)

Commissioner of the Commission on Elections
- In office March 8, 2022 – June 1, 2022
- President: Rodrigo Duterte
- Preceded by: Antonio Kho Jr.

Personal details
- Born: George Erwin Mojica Garcia
- Education: Lyceum of the Philippines (AB, LLB); Pamantasan ng Lungsod ng Maynila (LLM)
- Profession: Lawyer

George Erwin Mojica Garcia is a Filipino lawyer serving as the chairperson of the Commission on Elections (COMELEC) since July 22, 2022, being appointed by President Bongbong Marcos. He formerly served as a commissioner of the Commission on Elections from March 8, 2022, to June 1, 2022, being appointed by former president Rodrigo Duterte for a seven-year term. Garcia was one of the commissioners who oversaw the May 2022 Philippine general election. He was bypassed by the Commission on Appointments in June 2022. After Marcos became president, Garcia was appointed as chairperson, and was then confirmed by the Commission on Appointments in September.

== Early life and education ==
Garcia took his bachelor of laws at the Lyceum of the Philippines, then his master of laws at the Pamantasan ng Lungsod ng Maynila (PLM). Garcia then served as dean of the PLM School of Law.

== Legal career ==
Prior to becoming a COMELEC official, Garcia was an election lawyer representing Marcos, Panfilo Lacson and Grace Poe, among others.

In 2010, Garcia counseled for Bong Revilla, who explained that since Revilla, who has screen name "Ramon 'Bong' Revilla Jr.", had legally changed his surname to "Bong Revilla" in 2009, which led to his name appearing on the top part of the ballot, and not near the end as expected. In 2013, Garcia was the lawyer of E. R. Ejercito when he was dismissed as governor of Laguna after the COMELEC ruled him to have overspent in the 2013 Laguna local elections.

In 2015, in the runup to the 2016 Philippine presidential election, Garcia counseled for Grace Poe, whose Filipino citizenship was under dispute. Poe was able to run for president after the Supreme Court ruled that she was indeed a natural born Filipino and satisfied residency requirements.

After the election was decided, Bongbong Marcos, who lost the vice presidency to Leni Robredo, filed a case at the Presidential Electoral Tribunal, allegeding fraud. The tribunal dismissed Marcos's case in 2021, affirming Robredo's victory.

In 2019, Garcia also counseled for Alan Peter Cayetano and his wife, Lani Cayetano, who both had disqualification cases against them. Garcia was Koko Pimentel's counsel on the quo warranto case against him in 2020. The Senate Electoral Tribunal ruled that Pimentel serving from 2011 to 2013 should not be counted as a term as he had won an election protest against Migz Zubiri and was seated after the term had started.

== Career at the COMELEC ==
=== As commissioner ===
Garcia was appointed commissioner by then president Rodrigo Duterte in March 2022. Presidential spokesperson Martin Andanar said that it was "wise decision." Garcia oversaw the 2022 Philippine general election.

In order to keep their positions, appointees have to be confirmed by the Commission on Appointments. However, with the election results apparent, the commission saw it prudent to hold off on acting on Duterte's appointees, and postponed confirmation hearings on Garcia, among others, when it met in late May 2025. The commission did not confirm Garcia's appointment in its June 1 hearings.

=== As chairperson ===
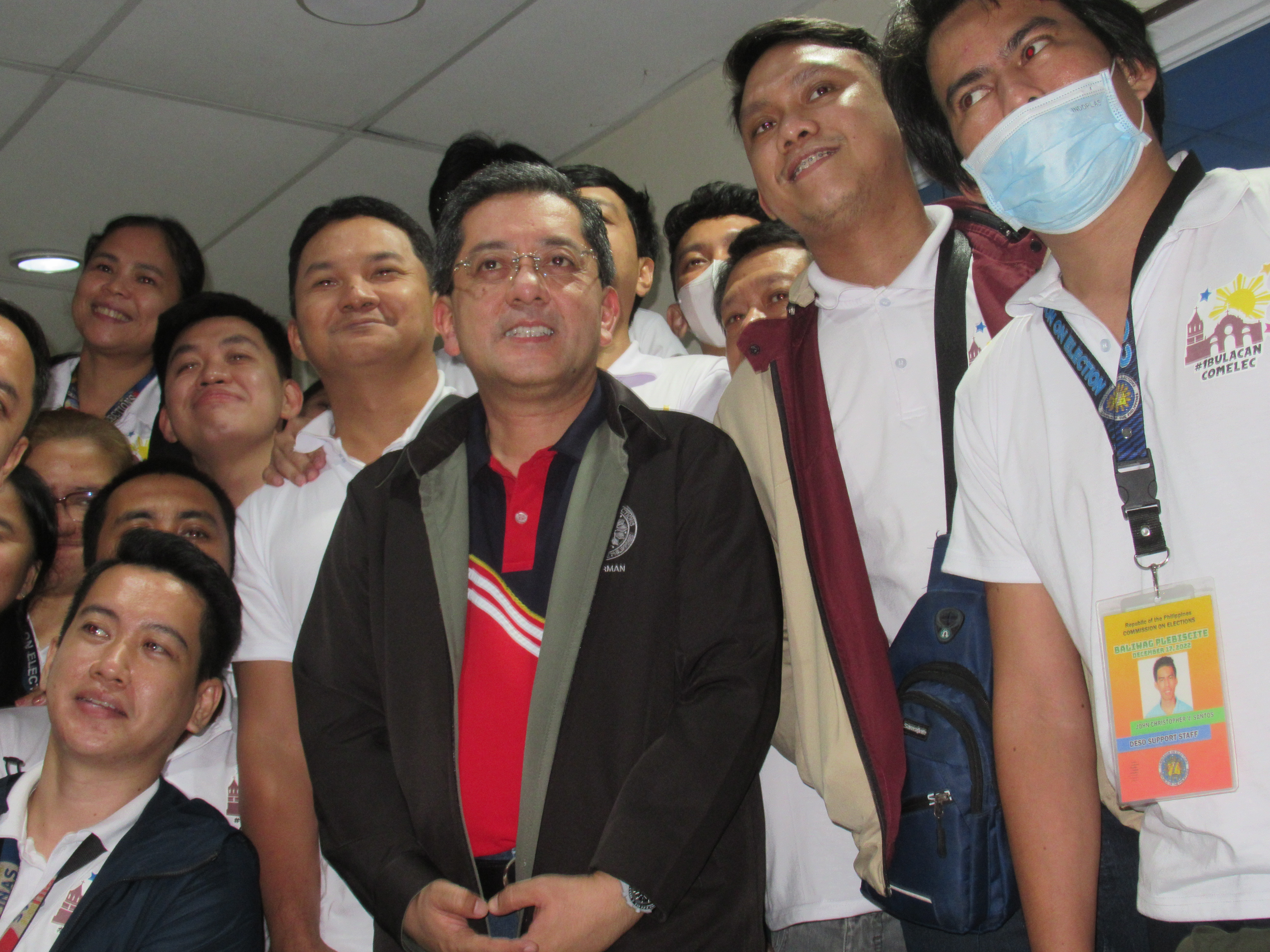
Garcia (wearing black jacket), at the 2022 Baliwag cityhood plebiscite

On July 22, President Bongbong Marcos appointed Garcia as COMELEC chairman, replacing Saidamen Pangarungan, whom the Commission on Appointments also bypassed along with Garcia in June. The Commission on Appointments confirmed Garcia on September. Garcia will serve a term that will end on February 2, 2029. Just as when he was commissioner, Garcia said that he will recuse from cases involving his former clients.

As COMELEC chairperson, Garcia oversaw the 2023 Cavite's 7th congressional district special election, of which he personally voted on, and several local plebiscites, including the 2024 Special Geographic Area plebiscites.

In the controversy if the results of the 2022 elections matched what was voted upon, Garcia volunteered that they "will open the ballot boxes. We can count the ballots one by one, and we’ll find out if they match the election returns. If they don’t match, then their accusation is correct. But if they match, it means the results are correct." For the 2025 Philippine general election, Garcia said that the COMELEC will prohibit premature campaigning, create precincts for people with special needs, increase the honoraria of election-day workers, and will publish expense reports of candidates.

In July 2024, SAGIP House representative Rodante Marcoleta insinuated a certain COMELEC official received bribes to approve Miru Systems as the technological provider of the 2025 Philippine general election. Garcia waived his rights under the bank secrecy law, releasing a document from Land Bank certifying that one of the supposed bank accounts he used in the alleged bribery scheme was “nonexistent.” Garcia later said that two Cayman Islands banks denied the existence bank accounts attributable to him. Later on, former House representative Edgar Erice sued Garcia for corruption, over the 18 billion-peso contract the COMELEC awarded to Miru Systems.

After the 2025 elections, Garcia faced a disbarment case, filed by losing candidate Jordan Pizarras, who alleged Garcia demanded 300 million pesos in exchange for him winning.

Order of precedence
Preceded by Marilyn Barua-Yap as Chairperson of the Civil Service Commission	Order of Precedence of the Philippines as Chairperson of the Commission on Elections	Succeeded by Gamaliel Cordoba as Chairperson of the Commission on Audit
