= Patricia Santo Tomas =

Filipino businessman

Secretary of Labor and Employment
- In office January 20, 2001 – July 3, 2006
- President: Gloria Macapagal Arroyo
- Preceded by: Bienvenido Laguesma
- Succeeded by: Arturo Brion

Chairman of the Civil Service Commission
- In office January 30, 1988 – February 2, 1994
- President: Corazon Aquino; Fidel Ramos
- Preceded by: Celerina Gotladera
- Succeeded by: Corazon Alma G. de Leon

Patricia Aragon Santo Tomas is a Filipino lawyer, government official who previously served as a Secretary of Labor and Employment, Chairwoman of the Philippines Civil Service Commission and Chairwoman of the Board of Development Bank of the Philippines from 2006 to 2009.

== Education ==
Patricia Aragon Santo Tomas graduated from Kamuning Elementary School and Quirino High School, both in Quezon City, Philippines. She received her Bachelor of Arts degree from Far Eastern University, her Master of Science from the University of the Philippines Los Baños, and her Master of Public Administration from the John F. Kennedy School of Government of Harvard University.

== Early work ==
Patricia Aragon Santo Tomas first worked in the government as a clerk at the Philippine Senate from 1964 to 1966. She gradually rose from the ranks and was transferred from one agency to another until her appointment as Chief of the Manpower Development and Utilization Division in the Department of Labor and Employment (DOLE) until 1977.

== Leadership experience ==
Santo Tomas held other positions as policymaker until her appointment as Administrator of the Philippine Overseas Employment Administration (POEA) from May 1982 to September 1987. She was appointed Assistant Secretary at the Department of Education, and was shortly re-appointed at the DOLE.

In 1988, she was appointed Chairperson of the Civil Service Commission (CSC) until 1994. The CSC is the central personnel agency of the government of the Philippines.

In 2001, she led an Executive Search Committee tasked to find qualified professionals to man key positions in the Cabinet and attached agencies of President Gloria Macapagal Arroyo. Soon, she was appointed by President Arroyo as Secretary of the Department of Labor and Employment (DOLE).

Santo Tomas was elected as Chairperson of the Governing Body of the International Labour Organization based in Geneva, Switzerland.

In 2006, Santo Tomas was appointed by President Arroyo as chair of the board of directors of the Development Bank of the Philippines, a state-owned financial institution with a nationwide branch office network.

== Awards ==
Santo Tomas has received numerous professional awards for government service and public leadership. She was a Ten Outstanding Women in the Nation's Service Awardee for Public Administration; an Outstanding Graduate of the Career Executive Service Development Program Phase 2; an Edward S. Mason Fellow at John F. Kennedy School of Government; a Harvard University Fellow; a Grantee of the United States International Visitor Program, and the United States International Communication Agency.

== Academe ==
Santo Tomas is a Professorial Lecturer at the University of the Philippines Los Baños and a Consultant at the Communication Technology for Rural Education.
