= Arturo Brion =

Filipino judge (born 1946)

The Honorable Arturo D. Brion
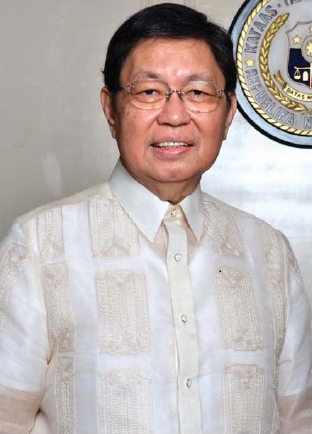

161st Associate Justice of the Supreme Court of the Philippines
- In office March 17, 2008 – December 29, 2016
- Appointed by: Gloria Macapagal Arroyo
- Preceded by: Angelina Sandoval-Gutierrez
- Succeeded by: Noel Tijam

Secretary of Labor and Employment
- In office July 3, 2006 – March 17, 2008
- President: Gloria Macapagal Arroyo
- Preceded by: Patricia Santo Tomas
- Succeeded by: Marianito Roque

Mambabatas Pambansa (Assemblyman) from Laguna
- In office June 30, 1984 – March 25, 1986 Serving with Rustico De Los Reyes Jr., Wenceslao Lagumbay, and Luis Yulo

Personal details
- Born: December 29, 1946 (age 79) Manila, Philippines
- Party: KBL (c. 1985)
- Education: San Pablo Colleges; Ateneo de Manila University; Ateneo Law School
- Affiliation: Fraternal Order of Utopia

Arturo Dizon Brion (born December 29, 1946) is a former associate justice of the Supreme Court of the Philippines. He took his oath as a member of the Supreme Court on March 17, 2008. From 2006 until his appointment to the Supreme Court, Brion served in the cabinet of President Gloria Macapagal Arroyo as the Secretary of the Department of Labor and Employment.

== Early life and education ==
Brion was born on December 29, 1946, in the city of Manila, Philippines, to Edon B. Brion (a retired trial court judge) and Laura S. Dizon. He grew up and undertook his primary, secondary and part of his tertiary studies in San Pablo City, Laguna.

He obtained his Bachelor of Arts, major in Mathematics, from San Pablo Colleges in 1970. He earned his Bachelor of Laws from Ateneo de Manila University Law School in 1974, graduating as cum laude and class valedictorian. He was editor-in-chief of the Ateneo Law Journal and a member of the Fraternal Order of Utopia.

Brion took the 1974 Philippine Bar Examinations and placed first with a bar general average of 91.65%. He thereafter practiced law at the Siguon Reyna, Montecillo, and Ongsiako Law Offices.

He also earned a Master of Laws, with concentration in Labor and Employment Law, from Osgoode Hall Law School of York University in Toronto, Ontario, Canada, in 1994. He obtained a Bachelor of Laws Equivalency Programme from the same law school. He was admitted to the Law Society of Upper Canada and to the practice of law in the province of Ontario in 1992.

== Career ==
Brion has worked from associate attorney to senior partner levels in various law offices. He was the Director of the Institute of Labor and Manpower Studies from 1982 to 1984. He served as an Assemblyman in the Regular Batasang Pambansa, representing the province of Laguna, from 1984 to 1986. He was appointed as Deputy Minister in the Ministry of Labor and Employment during the same period.

In Canada, he served as counsel in the Ministry of the Attorney General in Ontario, Canada, from 1992 to 1995. Later, he was appointed as Associate Justice of the Philippine Court of Appeals. In 2006, President Gloria Macapagal Arroyo appointed him as Secretary of Labor and Employment, a cabinet position vacated by Patricia Santo Tomas who was made Chairperson of the Development Bank of the Philippines.

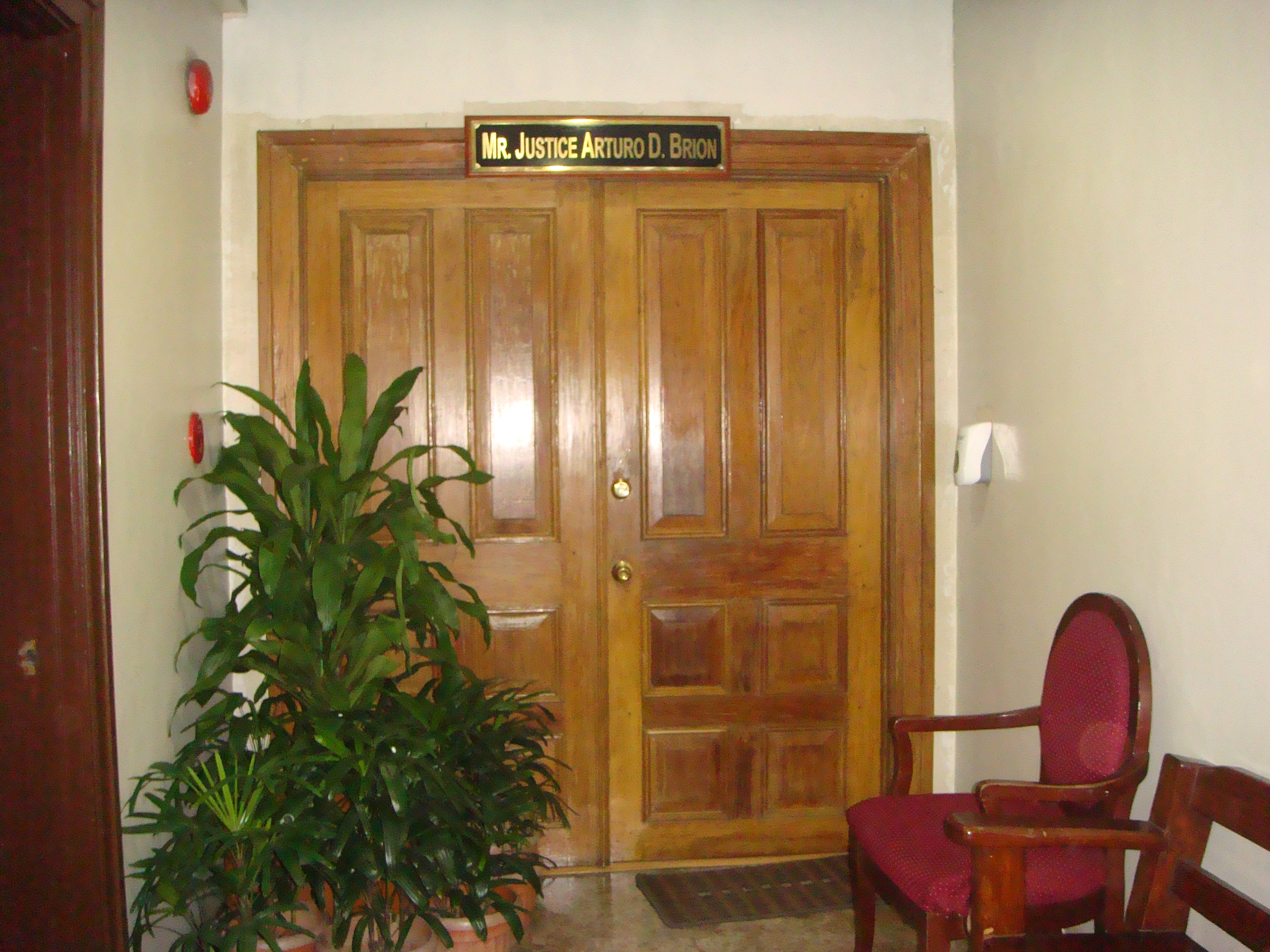
Chambers of Arturo D. Brion (new Supreme Court of the Philippines building)

Brion was among the nominees of the Judicial and Bar Council to fill the vacancies in the Supreme Court left by the successive retirements of Associate Justices Romeo Callejo Sr., Cancio Garcia, and Angelina Sandoval-Gutierrez. On March 17, 2008, he was named to the Supreme Court by President Macapagal-Arroyo to succeed Justice Sandoval-Gutierrez.

== Academe ==
Brion taught law at the Ateneo Law School from 1976 to 1982, 1986 to 1987, and 1995 to 1997. He authored an article entitled The Right to Refuse Unsafe Work in Ontario, which is archived in the libraries of York University.

His specializations lie in the fields of Labor Laws, Public Law, and Occupational Health and Safety.

== Organizations ==
Brion is an active member of the Integrated Bar of the Philippines (IBP). He served as President of the IBP Laguna Chapter from 1981 to 1983. He was a member of the Law Society of Upper Canada from 1992 to 1995.

He is also a member of the Fraternal Order of Utopia, an Ateneo Law School based fraternity established in 1964 which has produced 40 bar topnotchers since 1964, three of which have placed number one in the Philippine Bar Exams, one of which is Brion. During the time Brion was in the Supreme Court, Utopia had three members who were seated in the highest tribunal of the Philippines, one is Brion, another was Justice Robert A. Abad and Chief Justice Renato Corona. Utopia currently has two members who are seated in the highest tribunal of the Philippines, Chief Justice Alexander Gesmundo and Justice Rodil Zalameda.

== Private life ==
Brion is married to Antonietta C. Articona. They have two children. Antonietta is a chemist-lawyer (B.S. Chem, College of the Holy Spirit, and LL.B., Ateneo Law School, Class 1982). His son Arturo, Jr. is a computer engineer-lawyer (Computer Engineering, McMaster University, Ontario; LL.B., University of New Brunswick School of Law) engaged in Intellectual Property Law practice in Ottawa. His granddaughter by way of Arturo Jr., Antonella is a B.S. History graduate of York University (Toronto), an interior designer (International Academy of Design and Technology) and a published poet and Toronto-based book designer.

== Awards ==
In the Araw ng Maynila's 437th founding anniversary on June 29, 2008, Brion was named "Outstanding Manilan" in law. He was the master of ceremonies of Reynato Puno's July 1 "Forum on Increasing Access to Justice: Bridging Gaps and Removing Roadblocks."

Government offices
Preceded by Patricia Santo Tomas	Secretary of Labor and Employment; 2006–2008	Succeeded by Marianito Roque
Legal offices
Preceded by Angelina Sandoval-Gutierrez	Associate Justice of the Supreme Court of the Philippines; 2008–2016	Succeeded by Noel Tijam
