= Celerina Gotladera =

Filipino lawyer and first Chairman of the Civil Service Commission

Chairman of the Civil Service Commission
- In office February 2, 1987 – January 30, 1988
- President: Corazon Aquino
- Succeeded by: Patricia Santo Tomas

Personal details
- Born: Celerina Gillego; 1920
- Died: 1993 (aged 72–73)

Celerina Gotladera (born Celerina Gillego; 1920–1993) was a Filipino lawyer and politician who served as the Chairman of the Civil Service Commission during the Corazon Aquino administration.

Gotladera's husband, Pantaleon G. Gotladera, served one term as Mayor of Bulan, Sorsogon in the Bicol Region of the Philippines. The main hospital in Bulan, Sorsogon is named Pantaleon G. Gotladera Memorial Hospital in his honor. Gotladera served as Mayor of Bulan, Sorsogon, until her death. Celerina Gotladera Street, the main thoroughfare in Bulan, is named in her honor. She is the eldest sister of Bonifacio Gillego. She is the great-grandmother of basketball player Alfonzo Gotladera. Gotladera was admitted to the Philippine Bar Association on March 2, 1960.

== Charmanship of the Civil Service Commission (1987) ==
As chair of the Civil Service Commission, Gotladera oversaw major reforms and reorganization of the Commission, including its decentralization by establishing 30 field offices. She also created the Office of Personnel Relations.

== Articles and Legislation Authored ==
- Upgrading the Philippine Civil Service (1986)
