= Ramon Torres National High School =

Public high school in Negros Occidental, Philippines

- Pambansang Mataas na Paaralang Ramon Torres

Location
- Gen. Luna St., Brgy. Balingasag, Bago, Negros Occidental, Philippines; 10°31′50″N 122°50′24″E

Information
- Type: Public
- Established: 1947
- Principal: Mrs Mary Jane Araneta
- Grades: 7 to 12
- Campus: Urban

The Ramon Torres National High School (RTNHS) (Filipino: Pambansang Mataas na Paaralang Ramon Torres) is one of seven public secondary schools in the city of Bago, in Negros Occidental, Philippines.

== History ==
Ramon Torres National High School was originally named Bago Junior High School then, Bago High School, Bago Community High School, and Bago City High School.

With the implementation of Resolution No. 1310 series of 1977 passed by the Sanguniang Panlungsod of Bago and approved by Philippine President Ferdinand Marcos, the school was renamed Ramon Torres Memorial High School in honor of its chief founder, former Senator Ramon Torres, who had lobbied for its establishment in 1947 as Bago's first public high school.

In July 1983, Ramon Torres Memorial High School was again converted by virtue of Batas Pambansa 411 into the Ramon Torres National High School.

At the time it was established, the school had a population of 244 students, 124 boys and 120 girls in the school year 1947–1948. By 1972, the student population had reached 2,285 and by 1997, it had 8,807 students, including those in its six extension schools: RT Dulao National High School, Rt Malingin National High School, RT Taloc National High School, RT Sagasa National High School, RT Ma-ao Sugar Central National High School, and RT Louisiana National High School.

To decongest the RTNHS Main and minimize expenses among students residing at Barangay Dulao and Barangay Malingin, Resolution No. 1430 dated May 17, 1978, approved and authorized the establishment of two extension classes which opened on school year 1978–1979.

In 1979, extension schools were established at Barangay Sagasa and Barangay Taloc. There were approximately 4,000 high school students at the Main School for school year 1980-1981 and approximately 800 of these students resided at Barangay Ma-ao Central and its neighboring barangays. Due to this, the city school administration and city government officials decided to open an extension school at Barangay Ma-ao Central by virtue of Resolution No. 1886 series of 1980 and Resolution No. 1971 series of 1981. The RTHNS MSC Extension started its operation school year 1981–1982.

Due to the existing cost of secondary education in private schools located at Barangay Ma-ao, the Sanguniang Panlungsod established a public high school located at the Louisiana Elementary School campus effective school year 1984-1985 by virtue of Resolution No. 2562 series of 1984.

In 2007, the Schools Division Office authorized the opening of additional public secondary schools including RT Malingin National High School - Atipuluan Extension, RT Bagroy National High School, and the stand-alone Bago City Senior High School.

=== Past and present administrators ===
Principals

- Simplicio Arquero, Principal - 1947-1959
- Piedad S. Villanueva, Principal - 1960-1961
- Jorge M. Martir, Teacher-in-Charge - 1961-1962
- Alfredo Corral, Principal - 1962-1968
- Elisa T. Dreyfus, Principal - 1968-1975
- Ninfa T. Jardinico, Principal III - 1975-August 1993
- Heidi M. Estandarte, Principal IV - Sept. 1, 1993-Sept. 1, 2010
- Portia M. Mallorca, Assistant Schools Division Superintendent/Officer-in-Charge - Sept. 2, 2010-May 2011
- Fortunato M. Filomeno, Principal IV - May 2011–May 2018
- Elmer B. Cabiles, Public Schools District Supervisor/Officer-in-Charge - May 2018-July 2019
- Jonaida V. Gasendo, Principal III - July 2019 – present

== Curriculum ==
The Ramon Torres National High School implements the Basic Education Curriculum (BEC) as prescribed by the Department of Education of the Philippines.

Basic Education Curriculum
Subject	Grade 7	Grade 8	Grade 9	Grade 10
English	Grammar 7, Philippine Literature	Grammar 8, Afro-Asian Literature	English and American Literature, Mythology and Folklore	World Literature, Campus Journalism
Mathematics	Elementary Algebra	Intermediate Algebra	Geometry	Advanced Algebra, Trigonometry and Statistics
Science and Technology	General Science	Biology, Biological Science	Chemistry	Physics, Physical Science
Filipino	Balarila, Ibong Adarna	Teksto, Florante at Laura	Panitikang Pilipino, Noli Me Tangere	Panitikang Asyano, El Filibusterismo
Araling Panlipunan (AP)	Kasaysayan at Pamahalaan ng Pilipinas	Kasaysayan at Kultura ng Asya	Kasaysayan at Sibilisasyon ng Daigdig	Ekonomiks
Music, Arts, Physical Education and Health (MAPEH)	MAPEH 7	MAPEH 8	MAPEH 9	MAPEH 10/Citizenship Advancement Training (CAT) I
Technology and Livelihood Education (TLE)¹	Home Economics, Industrial Arts, Agriculture Arts, Entrepreneurship	Home Economics, Industrial Arts, Agriculture Arts, Entrepreneurship	optional	optional
Edukasyon Sa Pagpapakatao (ESP)	ESP 7	ESP 8	ESP 9	ESP 10

¹RTNHS offers the following TLE courses in Grade 9 and Grade Ten levels including: Culinary Arts, Dressmaking, Cosmetology, Nursing Arts, Related Crafts, Industrial Arts, Agricultural Arts, Entrepreneurship, Computer Education

== Administration ==
The Ramon Torres National High School is administrated by a secondary school principal. The current administrator is Dr. Jonaida V. Gasendo. There are also 9 department heads for academic, support and administrative units of the institution.

== Sections ==
The Ramon Torres National High School has 30 sections for the Grade Seven level, 23 sections in Grade Eight, 20 sections for the Grade Nine and 18 sections in Grade Ten. Each sections is facilitated by a Section Adviser and each year level is supervised by a Class Adviser usually assumed by the Section Adviser of the first section.
