= Marilyn Barua-Yap =

Filipino lawyer and civil servant

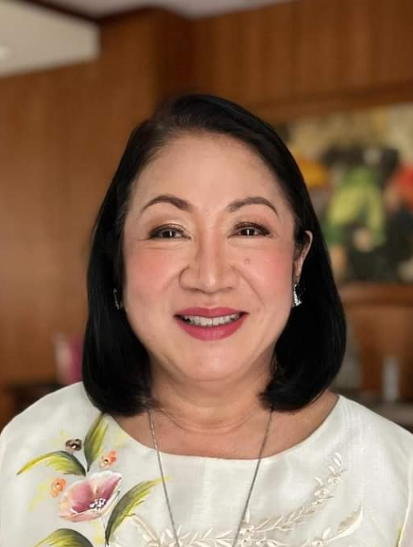

Chairperson of the Civil Service Commission
- Incumbent
- Assumed office October 16, 2024
- Appointed by: Bongbong Marcos
- Preceded by: Karlo Nograles

Secretary General of the House of Representatives
- In office 2007–2013

Personal details
- Born: January 9, 1953 (age 73) Laoag, Ilocos Norte
- Spouse(s): David Jonathan V. Yap (widowed, 2021)
- Education: University of the Philippines Diliman (AB, LLB, DPA); Ateneo de Manila University (MPM)
- Profession: Lawyer, Civil Servant, Lecturer

Marilyn Barua-Yap is a Filipino lawyer, civil servant, and academic who currently serves as the chairperson of the Civil Service Commission (CSC) of the Philippines. She was appointed by President Bongbong Marcos as ad interim chairperson on October 16, 2024.

== Early life and education ==
Marilyn Barua-Yap is a native of Laoag, Ilocos Norte. She completed her undergraduate studies at the University of the Philippines Diliman, where she graduated cum laude with a Bachelor of Arts degree in English and Comparative Literature. She studied at the University of the Philippines College of Law and passed the Philippine Bar Examination in 1985. She earned a Doctor in Public Administration degree from the UP National College of Public Administration and Governance. She also studied for a Master in Public Management at the Ateneo School of Government at Ateneo de Manila University.

== Career ==
=== Secretary General of the House of Representatives ===
Barua-Yap served in the government for 35 years, of which 29 years were spent in the legislative branch of government. She was the first woman to serve as Secretary General of the House of Representatives of the Philippines during the 14th Congress and was reelected in the 15th Congress.

=== Undersecretary of the Department of Agrarian Reform ===
Prior to her appointment as chairperson of the Civil Service Commission, Barua-Yap served as Undersecretary at the Department of Agrarian Reform, overseeing both the Special Concerns Office and the External Affairs and Communications Operations Office.

=== Chairperson of the Civil Service Commission ===
On October 16, 2024, President Bongbong Marcos appointed Barua-Yap as the ad interim chairperson of the Civil Service Commission (CSC). Her term as CSC chairperson expires on February 2, 2029.

On November 20, 2024, the Commission on Appointments confirmed Barua-Yap’s appointment as Civil Service chairperson. During the confirmation hearing, Senator Cynthia Villar delivered a sponsorship speech, stating, "Her background in law, public administration, and legislative reform makes her exceptionally qualified for the esteemed position of chairperson of the Civil Service Commission."

=== Academic career ===
Alongside her public service roles, Barua-Yap has been a lecturer at the University of the Philippines Diliman.

== Personal life ==
Barua-Yap's husband was fellow lawyer David Jonathan Yap, who served as the assistant dean of New Era University's College of Law and was a former Senate Legal Counsel. He died on September 19, 2021.

Political offices
Preceded by Karlo Nograles	Chairperson of the Civil Service Commission; 2024–present	Incumbent
Order of precedence
Preceded by Associate Justices of the Supreme Court of the Philippines	Order of Precedence of the Philippines as Chairperson of the Civil Service Commission	Succeeded by George Garcia as Chairperson of the Commission on Elections
