= Secretary of Labor and Employment =

Cabinet member

- Kalihim ng Paggawa at Empleyo
- Official seal of the Department of Labor and Employment

- Incumbent; Francis Tolentino (Acting) since May 25, 2026
- Style: The Honorable
- Member of: Cabinet, National Security Council
- Appointer: The president with the consent of the Commission on Appointments
- Term length: No fixed term
- Inaugural holder: Ramon Torres
- Formation: December 8, 1933 (92 years ago)
- Website: www.dole.gov.ph

The secretary of labor and employment (Filipino: Kalihim ng Paggawa at Empleyo) is the head of the Department of Labor and Employment of the Philippine government and is a member of the president’s Cabinet.

== List of secretaries of labor and employment ==
=== Secretary of Labor (1933–1935) ===
Portrait	Name (Birth–Death)	Took office	Left office	Governor-General
	Ramon Torres (1891–1975)	December 8, 1933	November 15, 1935	Frank Murphy

=== Secretary of Labor (1935–1941) ===
Portrait	Name (Birth–Death)	Took office	Left office	President
	Ramon Torres (1891–1975)	November 15, 1935	1936	Manuel L. Quezon
	José Avelino (1890–1986) (Note: Hermenegildo Villanueva (1938-1939), Sotero Baluyut (1939-1940), and Francis Tolentino (2026-present) served as acting secretaries)	1937	1939	Manuel L. Quezon
	León Guinto (1886–1962)	1940	1941	Manuel L. Quezon

=== Secretary of National Defense, Public Works, Communications and Labor (1941–1944) ===
Portrait	Name (Birth–Death)	Took office	Left office	President
	Basilio Valdes (1892–1970)	December 24, 1941	August 8, 1944	Manuel L. Quezon

=== Secretary of Justice, Labor and Welfare (1944–1945) ===
Portrait	Name (Birth–Death)	Took office	Left office	President
	Mariano Eraña	August 8, 1944	February 27, 1945	Sergio Osmeña

=== Secretary of Labor (1945–1978) ===
Portrait	Name (Birth–Death)	Took office	Left office	President
	Mariano Eraña	February 27, 1945	July 11, 1945	Sergio Osmeña
	Marcelo Adduru (1894–1972)	July 12, 1945	May 28, 1946	Sergio Osmeña
	Pedro Magsalin	May 28, 1946	September 21, 1948	Manuel Roxas
	Pedro Magsalin	May 28, 1946	September 21, 1948	Elpidio Quirino
	Primitivo Lovina	September 21, 1948	October 4, 1950	Elpidio Quirino
	Jose Figueras	October 4, 1950	December 30, 1953	Elpidio Quirino
	Terry Adevoso (1922–1975)	March 10, 1954	April 21, 1954	Ramon Magsaysay
	Angel M. Castaño	August 22, 1954	December 30, 1961	Ramon Magsaysay
	Angel M. Castaño	August 22, 1954	December 30, 1961	Carlos P. Garcia
	Norberto Romualdez Jr. Acting	December 30, 1961	November 29, 1962	Diosdado Macapagal
	Bernardino Abes	November 29, 1962	July 15 1964	Diosdado Macapagal
	Jose B. Lingad (1914–1980)	July 15, 1964	December 30, 1965	Diosdado Macapagal
	Emilio Espinosa Jr. (1922–2026)	December 30, 1965	September 16, 1967	Ferdinand Marcos
	Blas Ople (1927–2003)	September 16, 1967	1971	Ferdinand Marcos
	Adrian Cristobal (1932–2007)	1971	1972	Ferdinand Marcos
	Blas Ople (1927–2003)	1972	June 2, 1978	Ferdinand Marcos

=== Minister of Labor and Employment (1978–1987) ===
Portrait	Name (Birth–Death)	Took office	Left office	President
	Blas Ople (1927–2003)	June 2, 1978	February 25, 1986	Ferdinand Marcos
	Augusto Sanchez	March 25, 1986	January 4, 1987	Corazon Aquino
	Franklin Drilon (born 1945)	January 4, 1987	February 11, 1987	Corazon Aquino

=== Secretary of Labor and Employment (from 1987) ===
Portrait	Name (Birth–Death)	Took office	Left office	President
	Franklin Drilon (born 1945)	February 11, 1987	January 2, 1990	Corazon Aquino
	Dionisio dela Serna	January 3, 1990	January 19, 1990	Corazon Aquino
	Ruben Torres (born 1941)	January 20, 1990	February 11, 1992	Corazon Aquino
	Nieves Confesor	February 12, 1992	June 30, 1995	Corazon Aquino
	Nieves Confesor	February 12, 1992	June 30, 1995	Fidel V. Ramos
	Jose Brillantes	July 1, 1995	January 16, 1996	Fidel V. Ramos
	Leonardo Quisumbing (1939–2019)	January 16, 1996	January 26, 1998	Fidel V. Ramos
	Cresenciano Trajano; Acting	January 26, 1998	June 30, 1998	Fidel V. Ramos
	Bienvenido Laguesma (born 1950)	June 30, 1998	January 20, 2001	Joseph Estrada
	Patricia Santo Tomas	January 20, 2001	July 3, 2006	Gloria Macapagal Arroyo
	Arturo Brion (born 1946)	July 3, 2006	March 17, 2008	Gloria Macapagal Arroyo
	Marianito Roque	March 17, 2008	June 30, 2010	Gloria Macapagal Arroyo
	Rosalinda Baldoz	June 30, 2010	June 30, 2016	Benigno Aquino III
	Silvestre Bello III (born 1944)	June 30, 2016	June 30, 2022	Rodrigo Duterte
	Bienvenido Laguesma (born 1950)	June 30, 2022	May 25, 2026	Bongbong Marcos
	Francis Tolentino; Acting (born 1960)	May 25, 2026	Incumbent	Bongbong Marcos
