= Inventory Locator Service =

Inventory Locator Service, LLC
- Type: Private (subsidiary of CAMP Systems)
- Industry: Aviation, Marine, Defense
- Founded: 1979, Memphis, Tennessee
- Founder: John Williams
- Headquarters: Memphis, Tennessee, United States of America
- Number of locations: U.S.: Memphis, Atlanta, Boston, Dallas, Los Angeles, Miami, New York City, Philadelphia, Phoenix, San Diego, Seattle, St. Louis, Washington, D.C., Illinois; Europe: London, Paris, Istanbul; Asia: Shanghai, Singapore
- Owner: Hearst Communications
- Parent: CAMP Systems International, Inc.
- Website: ilsmart.com

Inventory Locator Service, LLC (ILS) is an American company that started the first e-Marketplace for aviation, marine, and defense industries. ILS has its headquarters in Memphis, Tennessee, United States of America, with relationships globally, especially in North America, through its parent company CAMP Systems, Inc., a subsidiary of Hearst Corporation. Inventory Locator Service was started in May 1979 by John Williams, founder of The Memphis Group, an aircraft parts dealer. ILS provided a business-to-business marketplace for its subscribers to search among millions of parts and negotiate orders.

== History ==
In 1985, Williams and his three partners became concerned that ILS might be vulnerable to competition and urged selling the company while it was profitable. The other partners agreed to sell and Ryder System, Inc purchased ILS. Ryder was a major player in the aircraft parts and service business, but kept ILS operations separate.

In 1988, ILS moved to a new location in Memphis, Tennessee. A switch in business conduct occurred due to the introduction of DOS software to PC users. Its first Windows software followed in 1994.

ILS introduced Internet access to its database in 1999-2000. In 2001, ILS was changed from a Tennessee corporation to a Delaware limited liability company. It was seeing record usage while other dot-coms folded in the collapse of the Internet bubble. It had about 6,000 subscribers at the time, and was succeeding in the face of new competition from start-ups, airlines, and OEMs.

On September 16, 2019, Hearst’s Camp Systems International acquired Inventory Locator Service (ILS) from the Boeing Company. The announcement was made by CAMP President and CEO Vibby Gottemukkala and ILS, headquartered in Memphis, Tennessee, became part of CAMP.

== Acquisitions ==
In 1983, Ryder acquired some aviation companies, including Aviation Sales Co. Inc. and its subsidiary General Hydraulics Corporation, of Florida, an aircraft leasing firm and spare parts firm. Aviall, an aviation solutions provider, was bought by Ryder in 1985.

In 1993, there was a spin-off of Ryder's aviation businesses, including Aviall. Aviall, Inc., became incorporated in 1993 as an independent global provider of new aviation parts, supply chain management, and other related value-added services to the aerospace aftermarket. Aviall, Inc. also became the parent company to both Aviall Services, Inc. and ILS. Later in 2006, Aviall, Inc. was acquired by The Boeing Company.

== Services ==
ILS is currently the largest provider of world-wide digital marketplace and aerospace business intelligence services for buyers and sellers of parts, equipment and services in the commercial and defense aerospace industry seeking to optimize their procurement, supply chain and MRO services. Data available on the ILS marketplace includes OEM (Original Equipment Manufacturer), USM (Used Serviceable Material), PMA data, Airworthiness Directives, Maintenance, Repair and Operations (MRO) Services and Unapproved Parts. The company also provides aftermarket information on supply, demand, and pricing data including FMV (Fair Market Value).

ILS launched the world's first fully integrated eCommerce solution designed for the Aviation Aftermarket, called SalesEdge Commerce™, which allows Aviation Services and Parts suppliers to market and sell 24/7 using a branded eCommerce storefront platform integrated with their website, ILS Marketplace presence and ERP.

According to an industry article, aviation parts distributors face challenges in manually processing high volumes of RFQs received via ILS and similar platforms, with delays that can result in lost opportunities in time-sensitive situations such as Aircraft on Ground (AOG).
