= Institute for Labor Studies =

Policy research and advocacy agency of the Philippines

- Surian ng mga Aralin sa Paggawa

Agency overview
- Formed: July 25, 1987; 39 years ago
- Jurisdiction: Philippines
- Headquarters: MegaOne Building, España Boulevard in Quezon City., Philippines
- Agency executives: Francis Tolentino, Chairperson; Jeanette Damo, Executive Director
- Parent department: Department of Labor and Employment
- Website: ils.dole.gov.ph

The Institute for Labor Studies (ILS; Filipino: Surian ng mga Aralin sa Paggawa) is the policy research and advocacy arm of the Department of Labor and Employment in the Philippines established to bridge the gap between labor research and governance, the institution is tasked with conducting comprehensive studies on labor, manpower, and social policy to help shape national decision-making, promote workers' welfare, and foster harmonious labor-management relations. The institution reviews existing labor legislation and develops approaches to promote productive labor management relations. The institute collaborates with other government instrumentalities to enhance national economic decision making. It maintains an extensive repository of socioeconomic data and publishes technical papers to guide legislative reforms.

The main office of the organization occupies the MegaOne Building along España Boulevard in Quezon City.

== History ==
The origins of the modern institute trace back to the creation of the Institute of Labor and Manpower Studies. President Ferdinand Marcos issued Presidential Decree No. 620 on December 21, 1974 to establish this original entity. The decree directed the original institute to provide the Ministry of Labor and Employment with technical support in policy formulation and program implementation.

The mandate of the initial entity included undertaking policy researches and implementing capacity building programs for government officials. The original institute functioned as a critical advisory body for the labor ministry during a period of rapid national industrialization. The researchers produced data to support the enforcement of the 1974 Labor Code of the Philippines. The original agency trained government personnel on the new legal frameworks governing employment standards and industrial relations throughout the late 1970s and early 1980s.

President Corazon Aquino initiated a government wide rationalization program to restructure executive departments. She issued Executive Order No. 126 on January 31, 1987 to reorganize the Ministry of Labor into the modern Department of Labor and Employment. Executive Order No. 126 formally abolished the original Institute of Labor and Manpower Studies. The newly formed Center for Labor Studies temporarily absorbed the research and publication functions of the abolished entity. The organizational structures of this temporary center served as the immediate baseline for subsequent institutional developments. The Department of Labor and Employment quickly recognized a growing need for more comprehensive research to back up its policy recommendations in the new democratic context.

President Aquino issued Executive Order No. 251 on July 25, 1987 to address the specific research requirements of the labor department. This also serves as the inception for the modern Institute for Labor Studies. Executive Order No. 251 amended specific sections of the earlier reorganization directive to formalize the new agency. The charter abolished the temporary research bodies and consolidated all policy analysis functions under the new institute. Since inception, the institute maintains its original statutory purpose as the definitive research authority within the Philippine labor administration ecosystem.

== Legal mandate ==
Executive Order No. 251 serves as the primary legal instrument governing the Institute for Labor Studies. Section 3 of the executive order officially articulates the legal mandate of the agency. The legal charter attaches the institute to the Department of Labor and Employment for administrative supervision. The executive order mandates statutory functions for the institute.

The institute is mandated to undertake research and studies in all areas of labor and manpower policy and administration. The researchers must review the rationale of existing legislations and regulations. The institute analyzes the cost involved in the implementation of such legislation against the benefits expected to be derived. The institute studies and develops novel indigenous approaches to promote harmonious labor management relations. The researchers develop programs to improve workers welfare services across all industries. The institute undertakes research projects in collaboration with other national agencies to enhance government decision making.

Its charter permits the agency to enter into agreements with international or bilateral institutions to carry out these functions. The institute is also mandated to expand the scope of its research interests into other countries and regions to benchmark domestic policies against global standards. The institute publishes its research studies for dissemination to the government and all concerned parties. The Secretary of Labor and Employment holds the authority to assign other related functions as provided by law.

The Department of Labor and Employment serves workers and employers through a strict framework of tripartism. It involves continuous consultation among Philippine government representatives, labor organizations, and employer confederations.

The Institute for Labor Studies generates the empirical data required for these tripartite negotiations. The researchers study national policies regarding their direct effects on employment generation and manpower development. The institute contributes directly to the formulation and updating of the National Employment Plan. The researchers draft labor legislation and other policy instruments to promote national economic goals. The institute monitors legislative developments and prepares technical comments on their potential impact on the labor force. The institute focuses specifically on vulnerable groups including children, women workers, overseas contract workers, agricultural workers, and informal sector participants.

== Governance structure ==
The Institute for Labor Studies operates under the direct leadership of an Executive Director and a Deputy Executive Director. The President of the Philippines appoints these executive officials based on the recommendation of the Secretary of Labor and Employment. The executive leadership oversees four technical divisions and one administrative support unit.

The Employment Research Division conducts studies to support policies that promote gainful and productive job opportunities. The division aims to support the national goal of attaining full employment. The researchers in this division assess the socio-political and economic environment regarding its effects on employment generation. The division develops approaches to bring government employment programs closer to the public. The researchers draft legislation to accelerate the attainment of national manpower targets. The division analyzes structural changes in the labor market and forecasts future skill requirements across different industrial sectors.

The Workers Welfare Research Division conducts studies to support policies that promote safe and humane work environments. The division assesses national programs regarding their impact on worker protection and productivity. The researchers propose policy instruments aimed at securing wholesome workplaces and humane terms of employment. The division focuses heavily on marginalized demographics within the Philippine labor force. The researchers study employment conditions for working youth, overseas Filipino workers, and the informal sector. The division evaluates existing social protection schemes and recommends interventions to expand coverage for non standard workers.

The Labor and Social Relations Research Division conducts studies in all areas of labor relations to foster democratic partnerships among workers and employers. The researchers assess significant societal conditions regarding their effects on social relations in production. The division develops legislation that encourage the strengthening of labor sectors toward socially responsible partnerships. The researchers analyze legislative developments affecting trade unionism, collective bargaining, and dispute resolution mechanisms. The division promotes constructive dialogue between management and labor organizations to maintain industrial peace.

The Advocacy and Publication Division publishes the research outputs of the institute. The division documents and disseminates studies to policymakers, academic institutions, and industry stakeholders. The personnel maintain information networking activities with national and international research institutions. The division organizes roundtable discussions and forums to validate research results. The division provides support services to the technical teams by maintaining a specialized databank and library. The division manages the digital footprint of the agency and coordinates the release of policy briefs and working papers.

== Research ==
=== Security of tenure and Contractualization research ===
Many employers in the Philippines utilize contractualization schemes to evade the financial obligations associated with regularized employees. The Institute for Labor Studies conducts exhaustive research on these employment practices to guide legislative reforms.

The institute published a highly technical cost benefit analysis of the regulatory areas in Book VI of the Labor Code in 2014. The researchers sought to determine whether the regulation on security of tenure acts more as a labor market restriction or an employment protection mechanism. The methodology involved calculating the ratio of total benefits gained against the total costs incurred by the regulation. The cost items in the economic model included litigation expenses and monetary awards. The benefit items included the salary and mandatory allowances of assumed employees alongside income tax revenues. The empirical analysis yielded a net present value of ₱756,820,206.88 with a benefit cost ratio of 0.823. A ratio below 1.0 indicates economic inefficiency in the application of the policy. The researchers calculated the cost per illegally dismissed employee at approximately ₱200,000. The study recommended a comprehensive regulatory impact assessment of the existing security of tenure provisions based on these findings.

The Labor Code of the Philippines permits employers to hire workers under probationary status for a maximum of six months. Workers who complete this probationary period acquire regular employment status and become entitled to mandatory health, security, and insurance benefits. The national discourse refers to illegal contractualization colloquially as end of contract or the 5-5-5 scheme. The scheme involves terminating contractual workers after five months and subsequently rehiring them for another five months to restart the probationary clock.

The Department of Labor and Employment attempted to regulate contracting and subcontracting through Department Order 18-A in 2011. The institute published a policy brief in 2015 examining the continued prevalence of the 5-5-5 arrangement despite regulatory prohibitions. The researchers identified severe grey areas within the implementation of Department Order 18-A. The institute noted that repeated short term hiring deprives workers of decent employment and creates artificial insecurity in the labor market.

The policy brief analyzed case studies across selected industries to identify specific models of repeated hiring practices. The researchers found that some principals used multiple contractors sequentially to maintain the same workers on short term contracts indefinitely. The institute concluded that the national government must amend the regulations to specify the exact number of months that constitute employment of short duration. The data generated by the institute directly informed the subsequent debates on the Security of Tenure Bill and the eventual revisions to department contracting policies.

=== Artificial Intelligence and the Philippine digital economy ===
The deployment of artificial intelligence technologies disrupted established employment patterns across multiple industries. The institute conducted empirical studies to project the scale of this disruption in the Philippine context. The institute published a major research paper titled Impact of Artificial Intelligence on the Labor Market in 2025. The researchers analyzed how machine learning algorithms alter specific task requirements within occupations. The study identified job categories at high risk of automation and sectors likely to experience net job creation.

The institute presented the key findings of this research to the Employers Confederation of the Philippines in April 2025. The presentation occurred during the launch of NaviGate, an AI powered chatbot developed with support from the International Training Centre of the International Labour Organization. The research emphasizes the necessity of continuous skills upgrading and lifelong learning programs. The institute provides policymakers with the empirical data needed to transition the workforce toward high value cognitive tasks that resist automation. The institute also studies telecommuting and work from home arrangements, analyzing how digital infrastructure alters physical workplace requirements.

==== Digital platforms ====
The rapid expansion of digital labor platforms created complex challenges for traditional labor administration. Digital platforms frequently classify their workers as independent contractors rather than employees. This classification excludes platform workers from standard labor protections and mandatory social security systems. The Institute for Labor Studies proactively investigates the working conditions within the gig economy to formulate appropriate regulatory responses.

==== Gig economy ====
The institute published research examining the legal classification of gig workers as a key national policy issue. The researchers focused heavily on delivery riders and other location based platform workers. It authored policy notes regarding the extension of social protection for digital labor platform workers. The research highlighted the vulnerability of gig workers to income shocks and occupational hazards due to the absence of formal employer relations. The institute also explored social dialogue mechanisms to uphold decent working conditions for freelance and contract workers in the broadcast media and theater industries. The institute proposed legal frameworks that bridge the gap between flexible work arrangements and essential social security coverage.

=== Youth employment and Science and Technology human resources ===
Youth unemployment remained a persistent structural issue in the Philippine economy. The institute evaluated government interventions designed to facilitate the transition from education to the workforce. The institute conducted a policy analysis of the JobStart program and Enterprise led Learning Networks in 2020. The researchers assessed the effectiveness of providing life skills training and subsidized internships to at risk youth. The study evaluated the capacity of these programs to reduce the time required for young graduates to secure their first formal employment contract. The institute used this data to advise the Department of Labor and Employment on the optimal allocation of resources for youth employment facilitation.

The institute collaborated with the Philippine Institute for Development Studies to forecast future skill requirements across the national economy. The two institutions coauthored a labor market analysis of science and technology human resource needs in the Philippines. The study examined supply and demand conditions using secondary data across various scientific disciplines. The researchers found that science and technology occupations display uneven growth potentials. The study concluded that both the government and the private sector must support these disciplines to meet the demands of the fourth industrial revolution. The institute utilizes this data to advise the Commission on Higher Education and the Technical Education and Skills Development Authority on curriculum alignment.

=== Social protection and Vulnerable sectors ===
The institute produced research to protect the vulnerable segments of the Philippine workforce. The institute published a study on the employment profile of persons with disabilities across selected regions in 2021. The researchers mapped the structural barriers preventing disabled individuals from accessing formal employment opportunities.

==== Domestic workers ====
The institute also evaluated the implementation of the Batas Kasambahay, a legislation designed to protect domestic household workers. The researchers assessed the regulatory measures toward realizing decent work for domestic employees and identified gaps in compliance. The institute participates actively in the formulation of gender responsive social protection policies. The institute engaged in a high level policy dialogue regarding gender responsive social protection reforms in April 2025. The researchers analyze how social security systems can better accommodate the interrupted career trajectories of female workers who assume caregiving responsibilities.

==== Employment of minors ====
The institute also reviewed regulations concerning the employment of minors. The institute participated in the stakeholders consultation on the review of Department Order No. 149 in 2025. The consultation aimed to update the guidelines for assessing and determining hazardous work environments for persons below 18 years of age.

==== TUPAD and OFW ====
The institute provided analysis of government emergency employment programs. The researchers published a study on public work programs including the Tulong Panghanapbuhay sa Ating Disadvantaged/Displaced Workers (TUPAD) program and the Cash for Work initiative. The study evaluated the labor market outcomes of these temporary employment interventions. The data allows the labor department to optimize the distribution of financial assistance to displaced workers during economic disruptions or natural disasters. The researchers also published a survey study on the return and reintegration of Overseas Filipino Workers (OFW) to guide repatriation policies.

=== Environmental policy and Green jobs ===
The Institute for Labor Studies participated directly in the formulation of green job policies and climate response strategies. It presented at the 28th Session of the Conference of the Parties to the United Nations Framework Convention on Climate Change in Dubai.

The institute lead tripartite consultations regarding the just transition to a sustainable economy. The institute stressed that managing the transition to a low carbon society must be grounded in social justice and labor rights. The researchers emphasized a human centered approach that ensures no worker is left behind during industrial restructuring. The institute evaluated the employment dimensions of disaster experience and recommends resilience building supports to reduce vulnerability. The institute proposed strategies to prevent massive job losses during climate induced crises. The institute also published a Bike to Work paper that aided the Department of Labor and Employment in crafting a program for workers who commute using bicycles. The study highlighted the intersection of environmental sustainability, public health, and occupational mobility.

== Research dissemination and advocacy ==
On March 29, 2022, the institute hosted the annual DOLE Research Conference to present its completed policy papers to stakeholders. The conference provided an inclusive platform for tripartite partners to discuss decent work concerns and legislative proposals. The event gathered representatives from the academe, civil society organizations, trade unions, employer confederations, and international development agencies. The researchers used this forum to subject their methodologies to peer review and public scrutiny.

The institute also conducted the Luna Lecture Series and the Design Thinking Olympics to foster continuous intellectual engagement with labor issues.

The Advocacy and Publication Division of the institute produced Working Paper Series, Research Digests, and Annual Reports. The institute partnered with the Philippine Institute for Development Studies to maintain the Socioeconomic Research Portal for the Philippines. The digital repository hosted technical papers and audiovisual materials generated by the agency. The portal featured the institute alongside other research bodies including the National Tax Research Center and the Ateneo School of Government. The accessibility of this data allowed national lawmakers and labor advocates to possess the empirical evidence required to draft sound economic legislation. The institute conducted webinars to ensure that their findings reach the general public and informal sector workers.
