= Ramon Torres (politician) =

Filipino politician (1891-1975)

The Honorable Ramon Torres
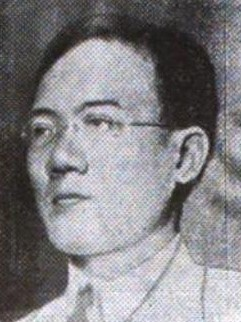

Senator of the Philippines
- In office July 5, 1945 – December 30, 1951

Member of the House of Representatives from Negros Occidental's 2nd district
- In office June 2, 1931 – September 16, 1935
- Preceded by: Vicente Jiménez Yanson
- Succeeded by: Pedro Hernaez
- In office June 2, 1925 – June 5, 1928
- Preceded by: Vicente Jiménez Yanson
- Succeeded by: Vicente Jiménez Yanson

16th Governor of Negros Occidental
- In office June 8, 1953 – September 12, 1953
- Preceded by: Leon Miraflores
- Succeeded by: Felix Amante
- In office October 16, 1940 – December 30, 1941
- Preceded by: Valeriano Gatuslao
- Succeeded by: Antonio Lizares

1st Secretary of Labor
- In office December 8, 1933 – 1936
- Preceded by: position established
- Succeeded by: Jose Avelino

Personal details
- Born: Ramón Torres y Araneta; June 12, 1891 Bago, Negros Occidental, Captaincy General of the Philippines
- Died: February 21, 1975 (aged 83) Bago, Negros Occidental, Philippines
- Party: Liberal (1946–1952); Nacionalista (1925–1946)
- Occupation: Politician

Ramón Araneta Torres (born Ramón Torres y Araneta; June 12, 1891 – February 21, 1975) was a Filipino politician who served in both houses of the Congress of the Philippines as well as the Cabinet of the Philippines.

== Early life ==
Ramon Torres was born on June 12, 1891, in Bago, Negros Occidental to Francisco Torres and Irene Araneta.

== Political career ==
In 1925, Torres was elected to the Philippine House of Representatives representing the 2nd district of Negros Occidental, serving until 1927. He returned to office in 1931 and served until 1935. During this time, Torres was concurrently appointed by Governor-General Frank Murphy to become the Philippines' first Secretary of Labor, continuing as such during the Commonwealth administration of President Manuel Quezon until 1936. During this time, he introduced and oversaw numerous reforms such as the eight-hour working day, mandatory medical attention for workers, the passage of Commonwealth Act 213 which defined and regulated labor unions and the Workmen's Compensation Act. In 1940, he was elected governor of Negros Occidental and served until 1941.

In November 1941, Torres was elected to the reestablished Senate of the Philippines. However, he and other senators were unable to assume their positions as scheduled due to the outbreak of the Pacific War and the Japanese occupation of the Philippines the following month. Torres formally took his oath as senator following Liberation in 1945 and was reelected in 1947. He served until 1951.

After leaving the Senate, Torres briefly served again as governor of Negros Occidental for three months in 1953.

== Legacy ==
In recognition for Torres' efforts in securing the establishment of the first public high school in Bago in 1947, a high school in the town is named after him.
