= Civil Service Commission (Philippines) =

Philippine independent constitutional commission

Civil Service Commission Komisyon ng Serbisyo Sibil

- The main office of the CSC in Quezon City
- Abbreviation: CSC
- Formation: September 19, 1900
- Headquarters: Civil Service Commission, Central Office, IBP Road, Constitution Hills, 1126 Quezon City
- Members: 1 chairperson, 2 commissioners
- Chairperson: Marilyn Barua-Yap
- Budget: ₱1.60 billion (2020)
- Employees: 1,228 (2024)
- Website: csc.gov.ph

The Civil Service Commission (Filipino: Komisyon sa Serbisyo Sibil, abbreviated as CSC) is one of the three Constitutional Commissions of the Philippines with responsibility over the civil service. It is tasked with overseeing the integrity of government actions and processes. The commission was founded in 1900 through Act No. 5 of the Philippine Commission and was made a bureau in 1905. The Civil Service Commission (CSC) is the central personnel agency of the Philippine government responsible for the policies, plans, and programs concerning all civil service employees.

It has 16 regional offices throughout the country.

The other two Constitutional Commissions are the Commission on Elections and Commission on Audit.

== Members ==
The 1987 Constitution staggered the terms of the members of the Constitutional Commissions. Of the first appointees, the Chairman would serve seven years (1st line), a Commissioner would serve five years (2nd line), and another Commissioner would serve three years (3rd line). Term refers to a fixed period, while tenure refers to the actual period that a person held office.

The names of the first members of the CSC from 1987 to 2000 were mentioned in the 2000 Supreme Court case Gaminde v. Commission on Audit; some notably served longer than their prescribed terms, that is from February 2 of the calendar year of when their terms started, then ending seven years thereafter; most served an exact seven years, or from the day they were appointed, ending seven years later. This practice ended in 2000 with the court's decision.

=== Current composition ===
==== Commission en banc ====
Current composition
Position	Line	Picture	Name	Tenure started	Tenure scheduled to end	Appointed by
Chairman	1st		Marilyn Barua-Yap	October 16, 2024	February 2, 2029	Bongbong Marcos
Commissioner	2nd		Ryan Alvin Acosta	February 2, 2022	February 2, 2027	Rodrigo Duterte
Commissioner	3rd		Luis Meinrado Pangulayan	February 10, 2025	February 2, 2032	Bongbong Marcos

==== Assistant commissioners ====
- Ariel G. Ronquillo
- Judith Dongallo-Chicano
- Hiro Masuda

=== Members since 1987 ===
Term started	Chairman (1st line, 7-year original)	Commissioner (2nd line, 5-year original)	Commissioner (3rd line, 3-year original)	Appointed by
February 2, 1987	Celerina Gotladera February 2, 1987 – January 30, 1988 Patricia Santo Tomas March 4, 1988 – February 2, 1994	Samilo N. Barlongay March 4, 1988 – February 2, 1992	Mario D. Yango March 4, 1988 – February 2, 1990	Corazon Aquino February 25, 1986 – June 30, 1992
February 2, 1989	Celerina Gotladera February 2, 1987 – January 30, 1988 Patricia Santo Tomas March 4, 1988 – February 2, 1994	Samilo N. Barlongay March 4, 1988 – February 2, 1992	Mario D. Yango March 4, 1988 – February 2, 1990	Corazon Aquino February 25, 1986 – June 30, 1992
February 2, 1990	Celerina Gotladera February 2, 1987 – January 30, 1988 Patricia Santo Tomas March 4, 1988 – February 2, 1994	Samilo N. Barlongay March 4, 1988 – February 2, 1992	Mario D. Yango February 2, 1990 – May 31, 1991 Ramon P. Ereñeta December 12, 1991 – February 2, 1997	Corazon Aquino February 25, 1986 – June 30, 1992
February 2, 1992	Celerina Gotladera February 2, 1987 – January 30, 1988 Patricia Santo Tomas March 4, 1988 – February 2, 1994	Samilo N. Barlongay February 2, 1992 – March 4, 1993 Thelma P. Gaminde March 4, 1993 – February 2, 1999	Mario D. Yango February 2, 1990 – May 31, 1991 Ramon P. Ereñeta December 12, 1991 – February 2, 1997	Fidel V. Ramos June 30, 1992 – June 30, 1998
February 2, 1994	Patricia Santo Tomas February 2, 1994 – March 4, 1995 Corazon Alma G. de Leon March 22, 1995 – February 2, 2001	Samilo N. Barlongay February 2, 1992 – March 4, 1993 Thelma P. Gaminde March 4, 1993 – February 2, 1999	Mario D. Yango February 2, 1990 – May 31, 1991 Ramon P. Ereñeta December 12, 1991 – February 2, 1997	Fidel V. Ramos June 30, 1992 – June 30, 1998
February 2, 1997	Patricia Santo Tomas February 2, 1994 – March 4, 1995 Corazon Alma G. de Leon March 22, 1995 – February 2, 2001	Samilo N. Barlongay February 2, 1992 – March 4, 1993 Thelma P. Gaminde March 4, 1993 – February 2, 1999	Jose F. Erestain Jr. February 11, 1997 – February 2, 2004	Fidel V. Ramos June 30, 1992 – June 30, 1998
February 2, 1999	Patricia Santo Tomas February 2, 1994 – March 4, 1995 Corazon Alma G. de Leon March 22, 1995 – February 2, 2001	Thelma P. Gaminde February 2, 1999 – February 2, 2000 J. Waldemar V. Valmores September 2000 – February 2, 2006	Jose F. Erestain Jr. February 11, 1997 – February 2, 2004	Joseph Estrada June 30, 1998 – January 20, 2001
February 2, 1999	Patricia Santo Tomas February 2, 1994 – March 4, 1995 Corazon Alma G. de Leon March 22, 1995 – February 2, 2001	Thelma P. Gaminde February 2, 1999 – February 2, 2000 J. Waldemar V. Valmores September 2000 – February 2, 2006	Jose F. Erestain Jr. February 11, 1997 – February 2, 2004	Gloria Macapagal Arroyo January 20, 2001 – June 30, 2010
February 2, 2001	Karina Constantino David February 23, 2001 – February 2, 2008	Thelma P. Gaminde February 2, 1999 – February 2, 2000 J. Waldemar V. Valmores September 2000 – February 2, 2006	Jose F. Erestain Jr. February 11, 1997 – February 2, 2004	Gloria Macapagal Arroyo January 20, 2001 – June 30, 2010
February 2, 2004	Karina Constantino David February 23, 2001 – February 2, 2008	Thelma P. Gaminde February 2, 1999 – February 2, 2000 J. Waldemar V. Valmores September 2000 – February 2, 2006	Jose F. Erestain Jr. February 2, 2004 – March 2004 Cesar D. Buenaflor July 2004 – February 2, 2011	Gloria Macapagal Arroyo January 20, 2001 – June 30, 2010
February 2, 2006	Karina Constantino David February 23, 2001 – February 2, 2008	Mary Ann Z. Fernandez-Mendoza May 2006 – February 2, 2013	Jose F. Erestain Jr. February 2, 2004 – March 2004 Cesar D. Buenaflor July 2004 – February 2, 2011	Gloria Macapagal Arroyo January 20, 2001 – June 30, 2010
February 2, 2008	Ricardo Saludo April 1, 2008 – September 30, 2009 Francisco Duque III February 2, 2010 – February 2, 2015	Mary Ann Z. Fernandez-Mendoza May 2006 – February 2, 2013	Jose F. Erestain Jr. February 2, 2004 – March 2004 Cesar D. Buenaflor July 2004 – February 2, 2011	Gloria Macapagal Arroyo January 20, 2001 – June 30, 2010
February 2, 2011	Ricardo Saludo April 1, 2008 – September 30, 2009 Francisco Duque III February 2, 2010 – February 2, 2015	Mary Ann Z. Fernandez-Mendoza May 2006 – February 2, 2013	Rasol L. Mitmug April 4, 2011 – early 2012 Robert S. Martinez July 6, 2012 – February 2, 2018	Benigno Aquino III June 30, 2010 – June 30, 2016
February 2, 2013	Ricardo Saludo April 1, 2008 – September 30, 2009 Francisco Duque III February 2, 2010 – February 2, 2015	Nieves L. Osorio March 10, 2013 – June 19, 2017 Leopoldo Roberto W. Valderosa Jr. June 19, 2017 – February 2, 2020	Rasol L. Mitmug April 4, 2011 – early 2012 Robert S. Martinez July 6, 2012 – February 2, 2018	Benigno Aquino III June 30, 2010 – June 30, 2016
February 2, 2015	Alicia dela Rosa-Bala September 15, 2015 – February 2, 2022	Nieves L. Osorio March 10, 2013 – June 19, 2017 Leopoldo Roberto W. Valderosa Jr. June 19, 2017 – February 2, 2020	Rasol L. Mitmug April 4, 2011 – early 2012 Robert S. Martinez July 6, 2012 – February 2, 2018	Benigno Aquino III June 30, 2010 – June 30, 2016
February 2, 2018	Alicia dela Rosa-Bala September 15, 2015 – February 2, 2022	Nieves L. Osorio March 10, 2013 – June 19, 2017 Leopoldo Roberto W. Valderosa Jr. June 19, 2017 – February 2, 2020	Aileen Lourdes A. Lizada February 2, 2019 – February 2, 2025	Rodrigo Duterte June 30, 2016 – June 30, 2022
February 2, 2020	Alicia dela Rosa-Bala September 15, 2015 – February 2, 2022	Ryan Alvin R. Acosta February 2, 2022 – present (Term to end February 2, 2027)	Aileen Lourdes A. Lizada February 2, 2019 – February 2, 2025	Rodrigo Duterte June 30, 2016 – June 30, 2022
February 2, 2022	Karlo Nograles March 4, 2022 – June 1, 2022 July 7, 2022 – October 7, 2024 Marilyn Barua-Yap October 16, 2024 – present (Term to end February 2, 2029)	Ryan Alvin R. Acosta February 2, 2022 – present (Term to end February 2, 2027)	Aileen Lourdes A. Lizada February 2, 2019 – February 2, 2025	Rodrigo Duterte June 30, 2016 – June 30, 2022
February 2, 2022	Karlo Nograles March 4, 2022 – June 1, 2022 July 7, 2022 – October 7, 2024 Marilyn Barua-Yap October 16, 2024 – present (Term to end February 2, 2029)	Ryan Alvin R. Acosta February 2, 2022 – present (Term to end February 2, 2027)	Aileen Lourdes A. Lizada February 2, 2019 – February 2, 2025	Bongbong Marcos June 30, 2022 – present
February 2, 2025	Karlo Nograles March 4, 2022 – June 1, 2022 July 7, 2022 – October 7, 2024 Marilyn Barua-Yap October 16, 2024 – present (Term to end February 2, 2029)	Ryan Alvin R. Acosta February 2, 2022 – present (Term to end February 2, 2027)	Luis Meinrado Pangulayan February 10, 2025 – present (Term to end February 2, 2032)	Bongbong Marcos June 30, 2022 – present
February 2, 2027	Karlo Nograles March 4, 2022 – June 1, 2022 July 7, 2022 – October 7, 2024 Marilyn Barua-Yap October 16, 2024 – present (Term to end February 2, 2029)	TBA	Luis Meinrado Pangulayan February 10, 2025 – present (Term to end February 2, 2032)	Bongbong Marcos June 30, 2022 – present

== Career Executive Service Board ==
Pursuant to Executive Order No. 891, s. 2010 the Career Executive Service Board (CESB) is mandated to promulgate rules, standards and procedures on the selection, classification, compensation and career development of members of the Career Executive Service. In Eugenio vs. Civil Service Commission, G.R. No. 115863, March 31, 1995, the Supreme Court recognized the existence, mandate and authority of the CESB over third level positions, and its autonomy from the Civil Service Commission (CSC)."

== Organizational structure ==
- Office of the Chairman
- Office of the Commissioners
- Office of the Assistant Commissioners
- Office of the Executive Director
- Commission Secretariat and Liaison Office
- Office for Legal Affairs
- Examination, Recruitment, and Placement Office
- Office for Human Resource Management and Development
- Civil Service Institute
- Office for Strategy Management
- Internal Audit Service
- Human Resource Policies and Standards Office
- Integrated Records Management Office
- Human Resource Relations Office
- Office for Financial and Assets Management
- Public Assistance and Information Office

== Publications ==
- Philippines. Civil Service Board (1906). Annual Report of the Philippine Civil Service Board to the Civil Governor of the Philippine Islands, Issue 5. Contributors United States. Philippine Commission (1900–1916), United States. Bureau of Insular Affairs. Bureau of Public Printing. ISBN 9715501680.

== Examinations ==
The CSC is tasked to generate roster of eligibles through these examinations:

- Career Service Examination (Professional and Sub-Professional)
- Career Service Examination for Foreign Service Officer (CSE-FSO)
- Fire Officer Examination (FOE)
- Penology Officer Examination (POE)
- Basic Competency on Local Treasury Examination (BCLTE)
- Intermediate Competency on Local Treasury Examination (ICLTE)
- Pre-employment Test
- Promotional Test
- Ethics-Oriented Personality Test (EOPT)

== Digital Transformation Initiatives ==
In April 2024, the Civil Service Commission (CSC) launched its digital transformation strategy in partnership with the Asian Development Bank (ADB). The collaboration provides technical assistance focused on assessing ICT resources, developing a digital strategy and governance framework, and building the digital capacity of CSC personnel. Implemented with the support of Ernst & Young (EY), the project is designed to strengthen efficiency, transparency, and data-driven human resource management within the civil service over a two-and-a-half-year period.

== See also ==
- Civil service commission, similar office in other countries
