= Saaduddin Alauya =

Maranao lawyer

Attorney Saaduddin A. Alauya
- Occupation(s): Professor, Judge, Lawyer, Politician
- Notable work: Author, Islamic Teacher
- Spouse: Hadja Maimona Basman Masacal-Alauya (Bai sa Bayabao)

Saaduddin A. Alauya is a Maranao lawyer, Aleem or Ulama, elected vice-governor of Lanao del Sur in the Philippines in 1989 and has served the province of Lanao del Sur as an acting governor from 1992 to 1995. He was appointed as chairman of the Code of Commission on Muslim Laws in Autonomous Region in Muslim Mindanao in March 1994. He then appointed by Former President Fidel V. Ramos as Jurisconsult in Islamic Law (also Shari’ah Law) of the Philippines serving from August 1996 to August 2015.

In 1983, he was teaching Islamic studies and laws at Mindanao State University - Main Campus until he resigned in November 1987. He is the author of several books on Islamic law particularly Muslim inheritance law, Quizzer in Muslim personal law, Fundamentals of Islamic jurisprudence, Islamic penal law, and Islamic procedure and evidence.

== See also ==
- Bangsamoro Autonomous Region in Muslim Mindanao
- Bangsamoro Parliament
