= Department of Labor and Employment (Philippines) =

Executive department of the Philippine government

- Kagawaran ng Paggawa at Empleo
- Logo of the department

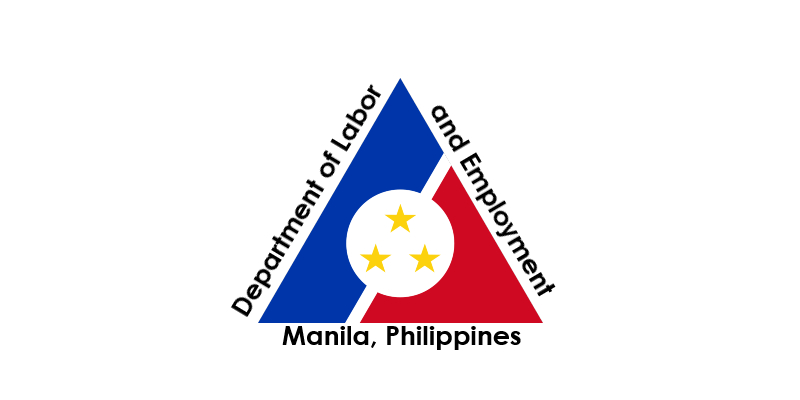
- Flag of the department

- DOLE building, Intramuros, Manila

Department overview
- Formed: December 8, 1933; 92 years ago
- Headquarters: DOLE Building, Muralla corner General Luna St., Intramuros, Manila
- Employees: 2,109 (2024)
- Annual budget: ▼ ₱41.4 billion (2023)
- Department executives: Francis Tolentino, Acting Secretary; Hero S. Hernandez, Head Executive Assistant, Office of the Secretary
- Website: www.dole.gov.ph

The Department of Labor and Employment (DOLE; Filipino: Kagawaran ng Paggawa at Empleo) is the executive department of the Philippine government responsible for formulating policies, implementing programs and services, and serving as the policy-coordinating arm of the executive branch in the field of labor and employment. It is tasked with the enforcement of the provisions of the Labor Code.

== History ==
=== American colonial period ===
Beginning as a bureau in 1908, the Department of Labor and Employment (DOLE) was founded on December 8, 1933, by virtue of Act No. 4121 of the Philippine Legislature. During the Great Depression, the labor department experienced challenges, particularly peasant violence throughout Central Luzon. The first labor secretary, Ramon Torres, proved to be unpopular among sugar workers due to him being a sugar hacendero himself. President Manuel L. Quezon then replaced Torres with Jose Avelino, who was a staunch anti-communist. Ineffective to handle the continued violence, Avelino was replaced with Leon Guinto as its third labor secretary. Unlike his predecessors, Guinto suggested social reforms to the president, albeit, creating a program dubbed "Quezonian communism". He thought that this would counter communism in the Philippines.

=== Republic of the Philippines ===
It was renamed as the Ministry of Labor and Employment in 1978. The agency was reverted to its original name after the People Power Revolution in 1986.

== Organizational structure ==
The department is headed by a Secretary with the following Undersecretaries and Assistant Secretaries:

- Undersecretary for Employment, Human Resource Development, and International Affairs Cluster
- Undersecretary for Labor Relations, Policy and Legislative Liaison Cluster
- Undersecretary for Workers’ Welfare, Protection, and Legal Affairs Cluster
- Undersecretary for General Administration Cluster
- Assistant Secretary for Employment, Human Resource Development, and International Affairs Cluster
- Assistant Secretary for Labor Relations, Policy and Legislative Liaison Cluster
- Assistant Secretary for Workers’ Welfare, Protection, and Legal Affairs Cluster
- Assistant Secretary for General Administration Cluster
- Assistant Secretary for Legislative Liaison Cluster
- Assistant Secretary for Regional Operations Cluster of Luzon and NCR
- Assistant Secretary for Regional Operations Cluster of Visayas and Mindanao

== Bureaus ==
- Bureau of Local Employment (BLE)
- Bureau of Labor Relations (BLR)
- Bureau of Working Conditions (BWC)
- Bureau of Workers with Special Concerns (BWSC)

== Attached agencies ==
- Employees' Compensation Commission (ECC)
- Institute for Labor Studies (ILS)
- National Conciliation and Mediation Board (NCMB)
- National Labor Relations Commission (NLRC)
- National Wages and Productivity Commission (NWPC)
- Occupational Safety and Health Center (OSHC)
- Professional Regulation Commission (PRC)
- Technical Education and Skills Development Authority (TESDA)

== Seals ==
Bureau of Local Employment (BLE)

Employees' Compensation Commission (ECC)

National Conciliation and Mediation Board (NCMB)

National Wages and Productivity Commission (NWPC)

Occupational Safety and Health Center (OSHC)
