= Archaic globalization =

Historical period of globalization

The 13th-century world-system, as described by Janet Abu-Lughod

Archaic globalization is a phase in the history of globalization, and conventionally refers to globalizing events and developments from the time of the earliest civilizations until roughly 1600 (the following period is known as early modern globalization). Archaic globalization describes the relationships between communities and states and how they were created by the geographical spread of ideas and social norms at both local and regional levels.

States began to interact and trade with others within close proximity as a way to acquire coveted goods that were considered a luxury. This trade led to the spread of ideas such as religion, economic structures and political ideals. Merchants became connected and aware of others in ways that had not been apparent. Archaic globalization is comparable to present day globalization on a much smaller scale. It not only allowed the spread of goods and commodities to other regions, but it also allowed people to experience other cultures. Cities that partook in trading were bound together by sea lanes, rivers, and great overland trade routes, some of which had been in use since antiquity. Trading was broken up according to geographic location, with centers between flanking places serving as "break-in-bulk" and exchange points for goods destined for more distant markets. During this time period the subsystems were more self-sufficient than they are today and therefore less vitally dependent upon one another for everyday survival. While long-distance trading came with trials and tribulations, still so much of it went on during this early time period. Linking the trade together involved eight interlinked subsystems that were grouped into three large circuits, which encompassed the western European, the Middle Eastern, and the Far Eastern circuits. This interaction during trading was early civilization's way to communicate and spread a number of ideas that caused modern globalization to emerge and allowed a new aspect to present-day society.

== Defining globalization ==
Globalization is the process of increasing interconnectedness between regions and individuals. Steps toward globalization include economic, political, technological, social, and cultural connections around the world. The term "archaic" can be described as early ideals and functions that were once historically apparent in society but may have disintegrated over time.

There are three main prerequisites for globalization to occur. The first is the idea of Eastern Origins, which shows how Western states have adapted and implemented learned principles from the East. Without the traditional ideas from the East, Western globalization would not have emerged the way it did. The second is distance. The interactions amongst states were not on a global scale and most often were confined to Asia, North Africa, the Middle East and certain parts of Europe. With early globalization it was difficult for states to interact with others that were not within close proximity. Eventually, technological advances allowed states to learn of others existence and another phase of globalization was able to occur. The third has to do with interdependency, stability and regularity. This is one of the driving forces behind global connections and trade; without either globalization would not have emerged the way it did and states would still be dependent on their own production and resources to function. This is one of the arguments surrounding the idea of early globalization. It is argued that archaic globalization did not function in a similar manner to modern globalization because states were not as interdependent on others as they are today.

== Emergence of a world system ==
Historians argue that a world system was in order before the rise of modern capitalism between the sixteenth and nineteenth centuries. This is referred to as the early age of capitalism, where long-distance trade, market exchange and capital accumulation existed amongst states. From around 3000 BCE to 1000 CE, connectivity within Afro-Eurasia was centered upon the Indo-Mediterranean region. In the 1st millennium BCE the sea-borne colonial trading systems of the Ancient Greeks, Phoenicians and Carthaginians came to span the Mediterranean area and a proto-"Silk Road" started to connect traders in Eastern and Western Eurasia.

By c. 800 CE Greek, Roman and Muslim empires had emerged at various times, covering areas known today as Europe and the Middle East. Major religions such as Christianity, Islam and Buddhism spread to distant lands where many continue to operate today. One of the most popular examples of distant trade-routes can be seen with the silk route between China and the Mediterranean, movement and trade with art and luxury goods between Arab regions, South Asia and Africa. These relationships through trade mainly formed in the east and eventually led to the development of capitalism. It was at this time that power and land shifted from the nobility and church to the bourgeoisie and division of labor in production emerged. During the later part of the twelfth century and the beginning of the thirteenth century an international trade-system developed between states ranging from northwestern Europe to China.

During the 1500s other Asian empires emerged, which engaged in trading over longer distances than before. During the early exchanges between states, Europe had little to offer - with the exception of slaves, metals, wood and furs. The push for selling of items in the east drove European production and helped integrate the inhabitants of Europe into the exchange. The European expansion and growth of opportunities for trade made possible by the Crusades increased the renaissance of agriculture, mining, and manufacturing. Rapid urbanization throughout Europe allowed a connection from the North Sea to Venice. Advances in industrialization coupled with the rouse of population growth and the growing demands of the eastern trade, led to the growth of true trading emporia with outlets to the sea.

There is a 'multi-polar' nature to archaic globalization, which involved the active participation of non-Europeans. Because it predated the Great Divergence of the nineteenth century, in which Western Europe pulled ahead of the rest of the world in terms of industrial production and economic output, archaic globalization was a phenomenon that was driven not only by Europe but also by other economically developed Old World centers such as Gujarat, Bengal, coastal China and Japan.

These pre-capitalist movements were regional rather than global and for the most part temporary. This idea of early globalization was proposed by the historian A.G. Hopkins in 2001. Hopkins main points on archaic globalization can be seen with trade, and diaspora that developed from this, as well as religious ideas and empires that spread throughout the region. This new interaction amongst states led to interconnections between parts of the world which led to the eventual interdependency amongst these state actors. The main actors that partook in the spreading of goods and ideas were kings, warriors, priests and traders. Hopkins also addresses that during this time period mini-globalizations were prominent and that some collapsed or became more insular. These mini-globalizations are referred to as episodic and ruptured, with empires sometimes overreaching and having to retract. These mini-globalizations left remnants that allowed the West to adopt these new ideals, leading to the idea of Western capitalism. The adopted ideals can be seen in the Western monetary system and are central to systems like capitalism that define modernity and modern globalization.

=== The three principles of archaic globalization ===
Archaic globalization consists of three principles: universalizing kingship, expansion of religious movements, and medicinal understanding.

- The universalizing of kingship led soldiers and monarchs far distances to find honor and prestige. However, the crossing over foreign lands also gave the traveling men opportunity to exchange prized goods. This expanded trade between distant lands, which consequently increased the amount of social and economic relations.
- Despite the vast distances covered by monarchs and their companies, pilgrimages remain one of the greatest global movements of people.
- Finally, the desire for better health was the remaining push behind archaic globalization. While the trading of spices, precious stones, animals, and weapons remained of major importance, people began to seek medicine from faraway lands. This implemented more trade routes, especially to China for their tea.

=== Economic exchange ===
With the increase in trade and state linkage, economic exchange extended throughout the region and caused actors to form new relationships. This early economic development can be seen in Champagne Fairs, which were outdoor markets where traveling merchants came to sell their products and make purchases. Traditionally, market fairs used barter as opposed to money, once larger itinerant merchants began to frequent them, the need for currency became greater and a money changer needed to be established. Some historical scholars argue that this was the beginning of the role of banker and the institution of credit. An example can be seen with one individual in need of an item the urban merchant does not ordinarily stock. The product seeker orders the item, which the merchant promises to bring him next time. The product seeker either gives credit to the merchant by paying them in advance, gets credit from the merchant by promising to pay them once the item is in stock, or some type of concession is made through a down payment. If the product seeker does not have the amount required by the merchant he may borrow from the capital stored by the money changer or he may mortgage part of his expected harvest, either from the money charger or the merchant he is seeking goods from. This lengthy transaction eventually resulted in a complex economic system and once the weekly market began to expand from barter to the monetized system required by long-distance trading.

A higher circuit of trade developed once urban traders from outside city limits travelled from distant directions to the market center in the quest to buy or sell goods. Merchants would then begin to meet at the same spot on a weekly basis allowing for them to arrange with other merchants to bring special items for exchange that were not demanded by the local agriculturalists but for markets in their home towns. When the local individuals placed advanced orders, customers from towns of different traders may begin to place order for items in a distant town that their trader can order from their counterpart. This central meeting point, becomes the focus of long-distance trade and how it began to increase.

=== Expansion of long distance trade ===
In order for trade to be able to expand during this early time period, it required some basic functions of the market as well as the merchants. The first was security. Goods that were being transported began to have more value and the merchants needed to protect their coveted goods especially since they were often traveling through poor areas where the risk of theft was high. To overcome this problem merchants began to travel in caravans as a way to ensure their personal safety as well as the safety of their goods. The second prerequisite to early long distant trade had to be an agreement on a rate of exchange. Since a number of the merchants came from distant lands with different monetary systems a system had to be put into place as a way to enforce repayment of previous goods, repay previous debt and to ensure contracts were upheld. Expansion was also able to thrive so long as it had a motive for exchange as a way to promote trade amongst foreign lands. Also, outside merchants access to trading sites was a critical factor in trade route growth.

=== The spread of goods and ideas ===
The most popular goods produced were spices, which were traded over short distances, while manufactured goods were central to the system and could not have been aided without them. The invention of money in the form of gold coins in Europe and Middle East and paper money in China around the thirteenth century allowed trade to move more easily between the different actors. The main actors involved in this system viewed gold, silver, and copper as valuable on different levels. Nevertheless, goods were transferred, prices set, exchange rates agreed upon, contracts entered into, credit extended, partnerships formed and agreements that were made were kept on record and honored. During this time of globalization, credit was also used as a means for trading. The use of credit began in the form of blood ties but later led to the emergence the "banker" as a profession.

During this period the Republic of Genoa and the Republic of Venice emerged as prominent commercial and maritime powers in Europe and in the Mediterranean area as a whole. Genoa, strategically located in the Mediterranean, controlled crucial trade routes connecting Western Europe with the Middle East and North Africa and the Black Sea. This positioning solidified its role as a vital commercial hub, facilitating the exchange of goods and ideas across continents. Meanwhile, Venice dominated trade in the Adriatic, establishing and maintaining an extensive network of routes known as the Venetian maritime empire. These routes reached into the Byzantine and Ottoman Empires, allowing Venice to wield significant economic and political influence in the region. Both republics fiercely competed for control of territories and trade routes, shaping the economic landscape and cultural exchange of their time.

With the spread of people came new ideas, religion and goods throughout the land, which had never been apparent in most societies before the movement. Also, this globalization lessened the degree of feudal life by transitioning from self-sufficient society to a money economy. Most of the trade connecting North Africa and Europe was controlled by the Middle East, China and India around 1400. Because of the danger and great cost of long-distance travel in the pre-modern period, archaic globalization grew out of the trade in high-value commodities which took up a small amount of space. Most of the goods that were produced and traded were considered a luxury and some considered those with these coveted items to have a higher place on the societal scale.

Examples of such luxury goods would include Chinese silks, exotic herbs, coffee, cotton, iron, Indian calicoes, Arabian horses, gems and spices or drugs such as nutmeg, cloves, pepper, ambergris and opium. The thirteenth century as well as present day favor luxury items due to the fact that small high-value goods can have high transport costs but still have a high value attached to them, whereas low-value heavy goods are not worth carrying very far. Purchases of luxury items such as these are described as archaic consumption since trade was largely popular for these items as opposed to everyday needs. The distinction between food, drugs and materia medica is often quite blurred in regards to these substances, which were valued not only for their rarity but because they appealed to humoral theories of health and the body that were prevalent throughout premodern Eurasia.

=== Major trade routes ===
During the time of archaic globalization there were three major trade routes which connected Europe, China and the Middle East. The northernmost route went through mostly the Mongol Empire and was nearly 5000 miles long. Even though the route consisted of mostly vast stretches of desert with little to no resources, merchants still traveled it. The route was still traveled because during the 13th century Kubilai Khan united the Mongol Empire and charged only a small protective rent to travelers. Before the unification, merchants from the Middle East used the path but were stopped and taxed at nearly every village. The middle route went from the coast of Syria to Baghdad from there the traveler could follow the land route through Persia to India, or sail to India via the Persian Gulf. Between the 8th and 10th centuries, Baghdad was a world city but in the 11th century it began to decline due to natural disasters including floods, earthquakes, and fires. In 1258, Baghdad was taken over by the Mongols. The Mongols forced high taxes on the citizens of Baghdad which led to a decrease in production, causing merchants to bypass the city The third, southernmost route, went through Mamluk controlled Egypt, After the fall of Baghdad, Cairo became the Islamic capital.

Some major cities along these trading routes were wealthy and provided services for merchants and the international markets. Palmyra and Petra which are located on the fringes of the Syrian Desert, flourished mainly as power centers of trading. They would police the trade routes and be the source of supplies for the merchants caravans. They also became places where people of different ethnic and cultural backgrounds could meet and interact. These trading routes were the communication highways for the ancient civilizations and their societies. New inventions, religious beliefs, artistic styles, languages, and social customs, as well as goods and raw materials, were transmitted by people moving from one place to another to conduct business.

=== Proto-globalization ===
Proto-globalization is the period following archaic globalization which occurred from the 17th through the 19th centuries. The global routes established within the period of archaic globalization gave way to more distinguished expanding routes and more complex systems of trade within the period of proto-globalization. Familiar trading arrangements such as the East India Company appeared within this period, making larger-scale exchanges possible. Slave trading was especially extensive and the associated mass-production of commodities on plantations is characteristic of this time.

As a result of a measurable amount of polyethnic regions due to these higher frequency trade routes, war became prominent. Such wars include the French and Indian War, American Revolutionary War. and the Anglo-Dutch War between England and the Dutch Republic.

=== Modern globalization ===
The modern form of globalization began to take form during the 19th century. The evolving beginnings of this period were largely responsible for the expansion of the West, capitalism and imperialism backed up by the nation-state and industrial technology. This began to emerge during the 1500s, continuing to expand exponentially over time as industrialization developed in the 18th century. The conquests of the British Empire and the Opium Wars added to the industrialization and formation of the growing global society because it created vast consumer regions.

World War I is when the first phase of modern globalization began to take force. It is said by VM Yeates that the economic forces of globalization were part of the cause of the war. Since World War I, globalization has expanded greatly. The evolving improvements of multinational corporations, technology, science, and mass media have all been results of extensive worldwide exchanges. In addition, institutions such as the World Bank, the World Trade Organization and multiple international telecommunication companies have also shaped modern globalization. The World Wide Web has also played a large role in modern globalization. The Internet provides connectivity across national and international borders, aiding in the enlargement of a global network.

== See also ==
- History of globalization
- Military globalization
