= Cotton production in China =

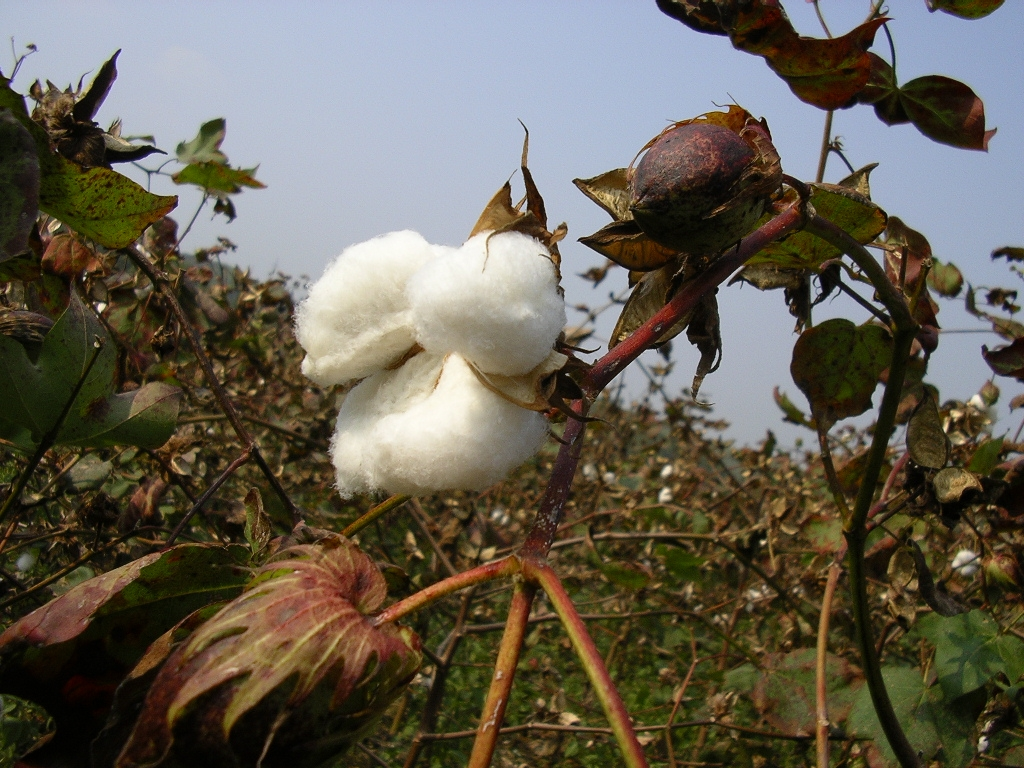
Cotton boll, staple fiber in Guangxi, China

Cotton production in China pertains to cotton which is the prime cash crop of China. Its production was the highest in the world (in excess of 20 percent of world production) from 1982 until being overtaken by India. Twenty-four of the 35 provinces of China grow cotton, with nearly 300 million people involved in its production. It is the main input for textile industry of the country with cotton textiles now accounting for 80% use vis-à-vis 95% in the 1950s. The cotton textile industry employs over 10 million people. Its production in 2012–13 was 7.6 million tons, but in 2013–14 it dropped to 7 million tons. Historically, its introduction in China is considered a 'southernization', a crop which originated from southern Asia (India) during the "proto-globalization" period.

== History ==
Cotton, which is called mian (棉) or mumian (木棉) in Chinese, was first reported from an area now known as Yunnan, some time around 200 BC. The Lao-ai tribe in the southwest border region is reported to have produced quality cotton cloth around 25–220 CE. In the Tarim Basin, archaeological finds of cotton cloth on mummies dated around 1,000 BC have also been reported. In the early Han dynasty period in Siachen in Western China, around 100 BC, quality cotton cloth has been noted. From all these documented and archaeological evidences, a historian has called the introduction of cotton in the country as "southernization" during which period the cotton species introduced were Gossypium herbaceum (an Afro-Asian species), Gossypium arboreum, and Gossypium hardense from India; the latter species were grown in Guangdong and Fujian provinces during the ninth century AD but were blocked for introduction into Sichuan province due to a strong silk lobby. However, adoption of scientific methods of cultivation came into practice only from 1949.

In the late imperial China, the challenging balance between population and fertile land compelled many Chinese farmers to transition from grain production to cultivating commercial crops, such as cotton in the Yangtze Delta. While had a higher return per unit of land, it did not translate to an increased return per individual workday.

== Areas of production ==
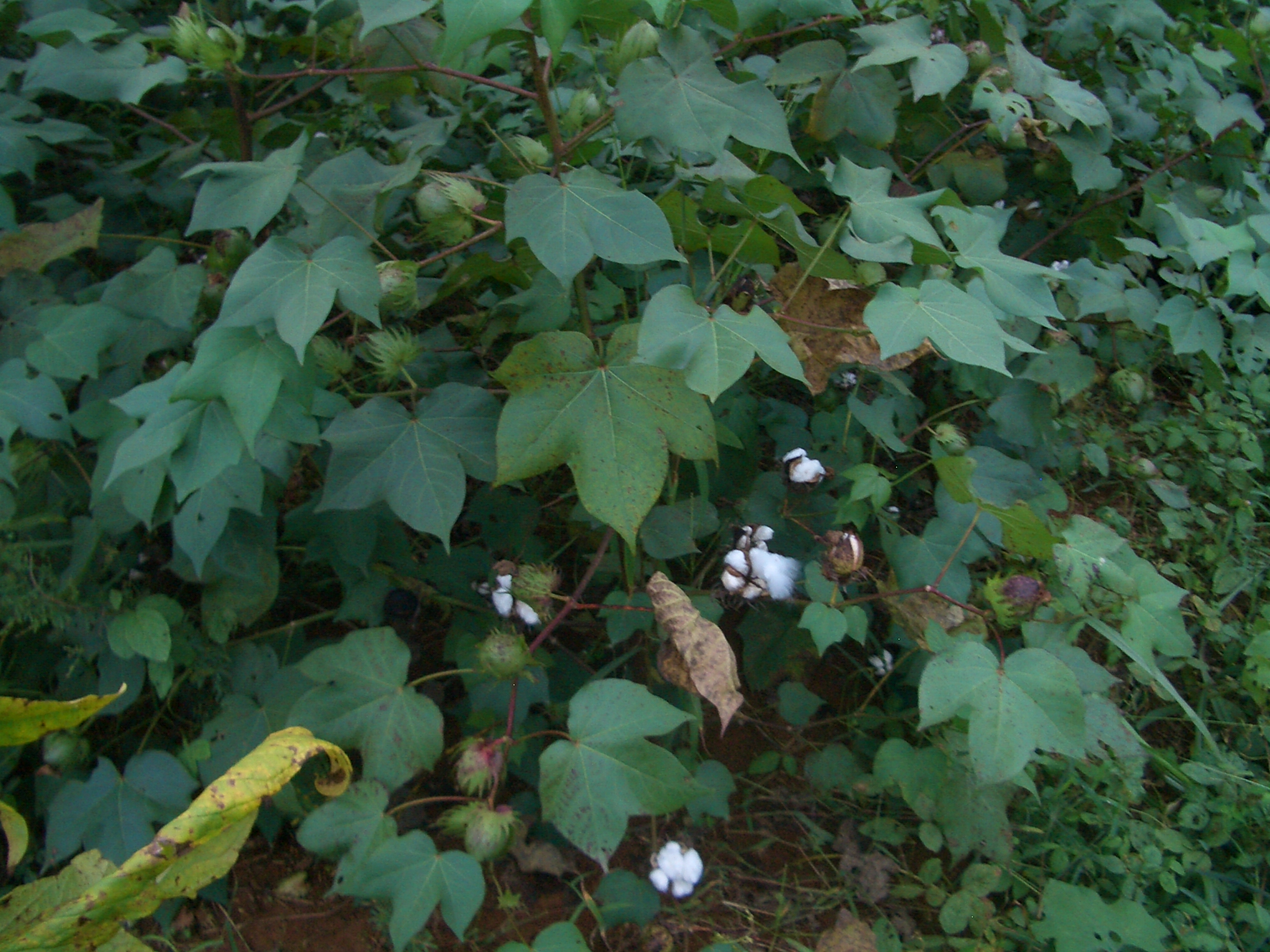
Cotton cultivation in Yangxin County

The cotton sown area accounts for about 30 percent of the total sown area of all the various cash crops. The major regions where cotton is a prime crop are the Xinjiang Uyghur Autonomous Region, the Yangtze River Basin (including provinces of Jiangxi and Hubei), and the Huang-Huai Region (mainly in provinces of Hebei, Henan, and Shandong). However, according to agroclimatic regions, they are under three zones of the northwest inland cotton region, the Yellow River valley region and the Yangtze River valley region, which together account for 99.5% area under cotton with a total yield of 99.7%. The area planted in 2012 was 5.3 million hectares and the average lint yield was 1,438 kilograms (3,170 lb) per ha.

== Varieties of cotton ==
Both Bt cotton and non Bt cotton varieties are used in China. Bt cotton is a major genetically modified crop, which is adopted for commercial production. This was introduced after several field trials in cotton growing provinces and found to be economically profitable in terms of not only production but also revenue. It was introduced in 2002 in about 45% of the country's total area under cotton, as it also proved to have better pest resistance. The Hybrid (F1) Bt cotton, developed after crossing with a non-Bt line, has found favour in southern China because of higher yield due to better methods of farming such as seedling transplantation and planting at lower population density. Now Bollgard Bt cotton is adopted in 55% of cropped area, while 45% of cropped area is planted with China's own Bt cotton.

== Production ==
According to a market research, China is the largest producer of cotton in the world, with a plant area of 3.0 million hectares in 2021. According to the FAO statistics for 2012, cotton production was 6.84 million tonnes with cotton seed production of 13.68 million tonnes. The crops grown are under intensive cotton cultivation practices, typically with Chinese adaptations covering special seedling transplanting (since 1950s), plastic mulching since 1979, plant training and double cropping of the cotton–wheat (Triticum aestivum) system (from 1980s to 1990s). Another practice introduced extensively since 1980 is the adoption of high-yielding cultivation pattern known as "short-dense-early" in the northwestern inland areas, which is stated to have contributed to China achieving the status of world number one in cotton production. However, during the 1870s Chinese officials saw a need to draft plans for the cotton industry to introduce machines. They wanted to move toward cotton production mechanization that would result in efficiency. The first machinery manufacture plant for cotton was established in the early 1900s.

== Bibliography ==
- Meador, M. Melinda; Xinping, Wu (2 April 2013). "China People's Republic of, Cotton and Products Annual 2013 4/2/2013" (PDF). USDA Foreign Agricultural Service.
