= History of globalization =

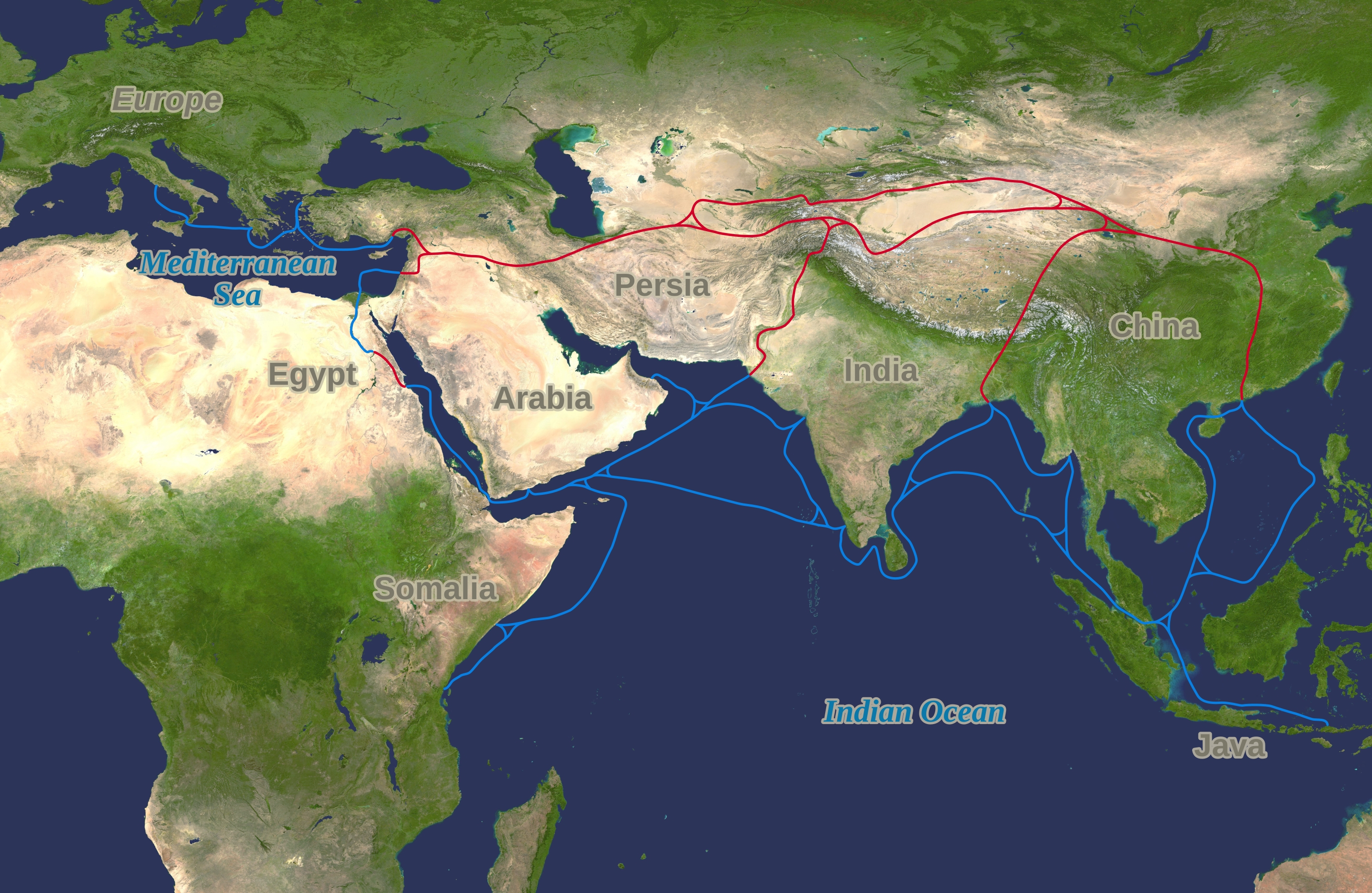
Extent of the Silk Road and Spice trade routes blocked by the Ottoman Empire in 1453 spurring exploration

The historical origins of globalization (also known as historical globalization) are the subject of ongoing debate. Though many scholars situate the origins of globalization in the modern era (around the 19th century), others regard it as a phenomenon with a long history, dating back thousands of years (a concept known as archaic globalization). The period in the history of globalization roughly spanning the years between 1600 and 1800 is in turn known as the proto-globalization.

== Periodization ==
Thomas L. Friedman divides the history of globalization into three periods: Globalization 1.0 (1492–1800), Globalization 2.0 (1800–2000) and Globalization 3.0 (2000–present). He states that Globalization 1.0 involved the globalization of countries, Globalization 2.0 involved the globalization of companies and Globalization 3.0 involves the globalization of individuals.

Klaus Schwab, founder and Executive Chairman of the World Economic Forum, Richard Baldwin and Philippe Martin have divided the history of globalization into four eras: Globalization 1.0 was before World War I, Globalization 2.0 was after World War II "[when] trade in goods was combined with complementary domestic policies", Globalization 3.0, for which other terms in use have included "New Globalization", hyperglobalization, the "global value chain revolution", and the period of offshoring, refers to a more recent period of change in global economic relationships, and Globalization 4.0 to current (2018 onwards) changes affecting services in particular.

== Archaic globalization ==
Perhaps the extreme proponent of a deep historical origin for globalization was Andre Gunder Frank, an economist associated with dependency theory. Frank argued that a form of globalization has been in existence since the rise of trade links between Sumer and the Indus Valley civilization in the third millennium BC. Critics of this idea contend that it rests upon an over-broad definition of globalization.

Even as early as the Prehistoric period, the roots of modern globalization could be found. Territorial expansion by our ancestors to all five continents was a critical component in establishing globalization. The development of agriculture furthered globalization by converting the vast majority of the world's population into a settled lifestyle. However, globalization failed to accelerate due to lack of long-distance interaction and technology. The contemporary process of globalization likely occurred around the middle of the 19th century as increased capital and labor mobility coupled with decreased transport costs led to a smaller world.

The 13th century world-system

An early form of globalized economics and culture, known as archaic globalization, existed during the Hellenistic Age, when commercialized urban centers were focused around the axis of Greek culture over a wide range that stretched from India to Spain, with such cities as Alexandria, Athens, and Antioch at its center. Trade was widespread during that period, and it is the first time the idea of a cosmopolitan culture (from Greek "Cosmopolis", meaning "world city") emerged. Others have perceived an early form of globalization in the trade links between the Roman Empire, the Parthian Empire, and the Han Dynasty. The increasing articulation of commercial links between these powers inspired the development of the Silk Road, which started in western China, reached the boundaries of the Parthian empire, and continued onwards towards Rome.

The Islamic Golden Age was also an important early stage of globalization, when Jewish and Muslim traders and explorers established a sustained economy across the Old World resulting in a globalization of crops, trade, knowledge and technology. Globally significant crops such as sugar and cotton became widely cultivated across the Muslim world in this period, while the necessity of learning Arabic and completing the Hajj created a cosmopolitan culture.

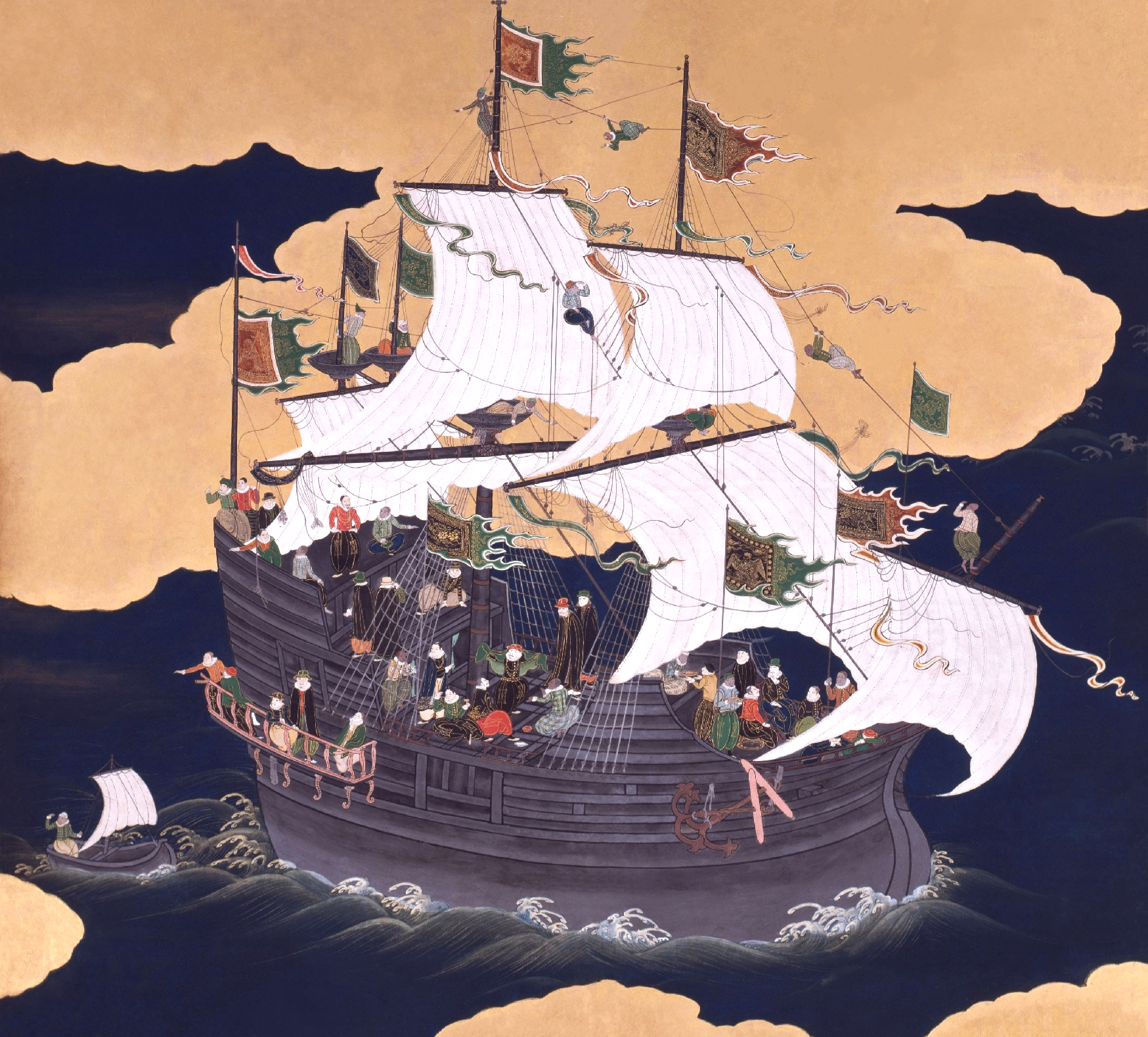
Portuguese carrack in Nagasaki, 17th-century Japanese Nanban art

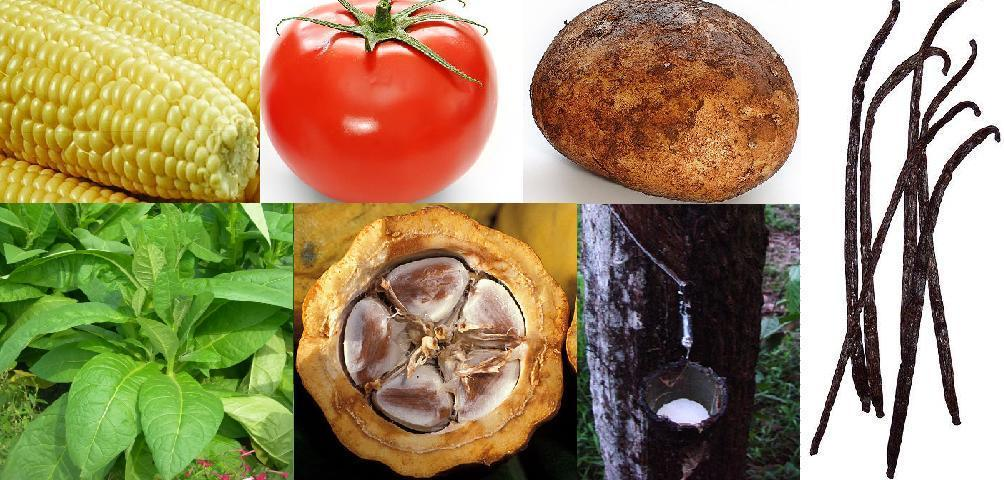
Native New World crops exchanged globally: Maize, Tomato, Potato, Vanilla, Rubber, Cocoa, Tobacco

The advent of the Mongol Empire, though destabilizing to the commercial centers of the Middle East and China, greatly facilitated travel along the Silk Road. This permitted travelers and missionaries such as Marco Polo to journey successfully (and profitably) from one end of Eurasia to the other. The Pax Mongolica of the thirteenth century had several other notable globalizing effects. It witnessed the creation of the first international postal service, as well as the rapid transmission of epidemic diseases such as bubonic plague across the newly unified regions of Central Asia. These pre-modern phases of global or hemispheric exchange are sometimes known as archaic globalization. Up to the sixteenth century, however, even the largest systems of international exchange were limited to the Old World.

== Proto-globalization ==
Proto-globalization was characterized by the rise of maritime European empires, in the 15th, 16th and 17th centuries, first the Portuguese and Spanish Empires, and later the Dutch, British and French Empires. In the 17th century, globalization became also a private business phenomenon when chartered companies like British East India Company (founded in 1600), often described as the first multinational corporation, as well as the Dutch East India Company (founded in 1602) were established.

The Age of Discovery brought a broad change in globalization, being the first period in which Eurasia and Africa engaged in substantial cultural, material and biologic exchange with the New World. It began in the late 15th century, when the two Kingdoms of the Iberian Peninsula – Portugal and Castile – sent the first exploratory voyages around the Cape of Good Hope and to the Americas, "discovered" in 1492 by Christopher Columbus. Shortly before the turn of the 16th century, Portuguese started establishing trading posts (factories) from Africa to Asia and Brazil, to deal with the trade of local products like slaves, gold, spices and timber, introducing an international business center under a royal monopoly, the Casa da Índia.

Global integration continued with the European colonization of the Americas initiating the Columbian Exchange, the enormous widespread exchange of plants, animals, foods, human populations (including slaves), communicable diseases, and culture between the Eastern and Western hemispheres. It was one of the most significant global events concerning ecology, agriculture, and culture in history. New crops that had come from the Americas via the European seafarers in the 16th century significantly contributed to the world's population growth.

== Modern globalization ==
Animated map showing Colonial empires evolution from 1492 to present

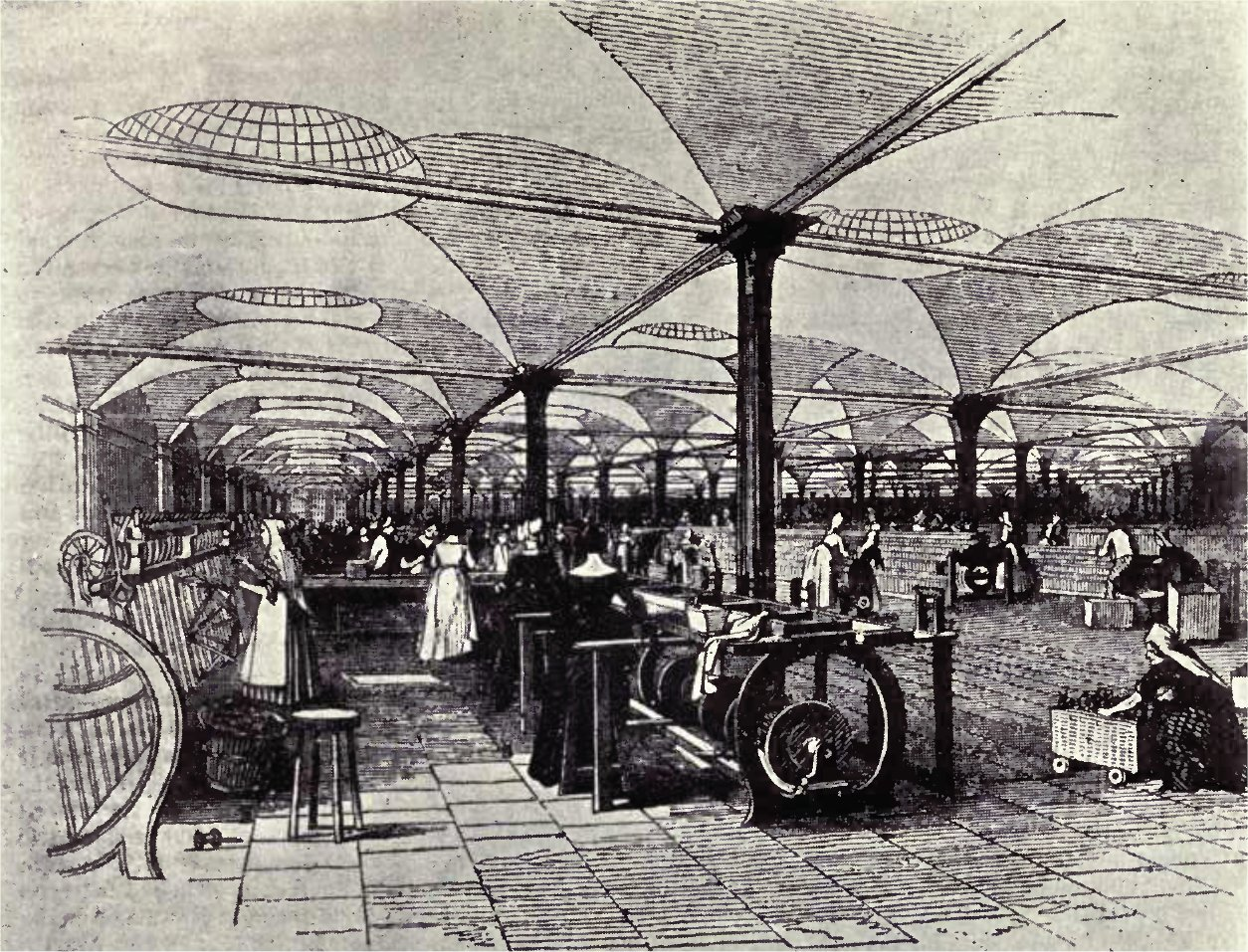
19th century Great Britain becomes the first global economic superpower, because of superior manufacturing technology and improved global communications such as steamships and railroads.

The 19th century witnessed the advent of globalization approaching its modern form. Industrialization allowed cheap production of household items using economies of scale, while rapid population growth created sustained demand for commodities. Globalization in this period was decisively shaped by nineteenth-century imperialism. After the First and Second Opium Wars, which opened up China to foreign trade, and the completion of the British conquest of India, the vast populations of these regions became ready consumers of European exports. It was in this period that areas of sub-Saharan Africa and the Pacific islands were incorporated into the world system. Meanwhile, the conquest of parts of the globe, notably sub-Saharan Africa, by Europeans yielded valuable natural resources such as rubber, diamonds and coal and helped fuel trade and investment between the European imperial powers, their colonies, and the United States.

The inhabitant of London could order by telephone, sipping his morning tea, the various products of the whole earth, and reasonably expect their early delivery upon his doorstep. Militarism and imperialism of racial and cultural rivalries were little more than the amusements of his daily newspaper. What an extraordinary episode in the economic progress of man was that age which came to an end in August 1914.

Between the globalization in the 19th and 20th centuries, there are significant differences. There are two main points on which the differences can be seen. One point is the global trade in these centuries as well as the capital, investment and the economy.

Global trade

The global trade in the 20th century shows a higher share of trade in merchant production, a growth of the trade in services and the rise of production and trade by multinational firms. The production of merchant goods in the 20th century largely decreased from the levels seen in the 19th century. However, the amount of merchant goods that were produced for the merchandise trade grew. The trade in services also grew more important in the 20th compared to the 19th century. The last point that distinguishes the global trade in the 19th century compared to the global trade in the 20th century, is the extent of multinational cooperation. In the 20th century, you can see a "quantum leap" in multinational cooperation compared to the 19th century. Before the 20th century began, there were just Portfolio investment, but no trade-related or production-relation Direct investment.

Commercial integration has improved since the last century, barriers that inhibit trade are lower and transport costs have decreased. Multinational trade contracts and agreements have been signed, like the General Agreement on Tariffs and Trade (GATT), North American Free Trade Agreement (NAFTA), the European Union (EU) has been hugely involved in eliminating tariffs between member states, and the World Trade Organization. From 1890 and up to World War I instability in trade was a problem, but in the post war period there has mostly been economic expansion which leads to stability. Nations have to take care of their own products; they have to make sure that foreign goods do not suffocate their domestic products causing unemployment and maybe social instability. Technological changes have caused lower transporting costs; it takes just a few hours to transport goods between continents to-day, instead of weeks or even months in the nineteenth century.

By considering financial crises, one key difference is the monetary regime. In the 19th century it occurred under the fixed exchange rates of the gold standard. But in the 20th century it took place in a regime of managed flexibility. Furthermore, in the 19th century countries had developed effective lenders of last resort, but the same was not true at the periphery and countries there suffered the consequences. A century later there was a domestic safety net in most emerging countries so that banking panics were changed into situations where the debts of an insolvent banking system were taken over by the government. The recovery from banking crisis is another key difference. It has tended to begin earlier in the recent period than in the typical crisis episode a hundred years ago. In the 19th century there were no international rescue packages available to emerging economies. But in the recent period such rescues were a typical component of the financial landscape all over the world.

The flows information were an important downside in 19th century. Prior to the Transatlantic cable and the Radiotelephone, it used to take very long for information to go from one place to another. So this means that it was very difficult to analyze the information. For instance, it was not so easy to distinguish good and bad credits. Therefore, the information asymmetry played a very important role in international investments. The railway bonds serve as a great example. There was also many contracting problems. It was very difficult for companies working overseas to manage their operations in other parts of the world, so this was clearly a big barrier to investment. Several macroeconomic factors such as exchange risks and uncertain monetary policies were a big barrier for international investments as well. The accounting standards in the U.S. were relatively underdeveloped in the 19th century. The British investors played a very important role in transferring their accounting practices to the new emerging markets.

== Aftermath of World War I: collapse of globalization ==
The first phase of "modern globalization" began to break down at the beginning of the 20th century, with World War I. The European-dominated networks were increasingly confronted with images and stories of 'others', thus, they took it upon themselves to take the role of world's guardians of universal law and morality. Racist and unequal practices became also part of their practices in search of materials and resources that came from other regions of the world. The increase of world trade before, beginning in 1850 til right before World War I broke out in 1914, incentivized bases of direct colonial rule in the global South. Since other European currencies were becoming quite largely circulated, the need to own resource bases became imperative. The novelist VM Yeates criticised the financial forces of globalization as a factor in creating World War I. Financial forces as a factor for creating World War 1 seem to be partly responsible. An example of this would be France's colonial rule over most of Africa during the 20th century. Before World War I broke out, there were no specific aims for the wars in Africa from the French, which left Africans in a “lost” state. The military potential of Africa was emphasized over its economic potential, at first. France's interest in the military potential of French Africa took a while to be accepted. Africans in the French army were treated with feelings of inferiority from the French. The economic incentive for colonial rule came in 1917, when France was faced with a crisis of food supply. This coming after the outbreak of the war which had left France without the ability to support itself agriculturally since France had a shortage of fertilizers and machinery in 1917.

== Post-World War II: globalization resurgent ==
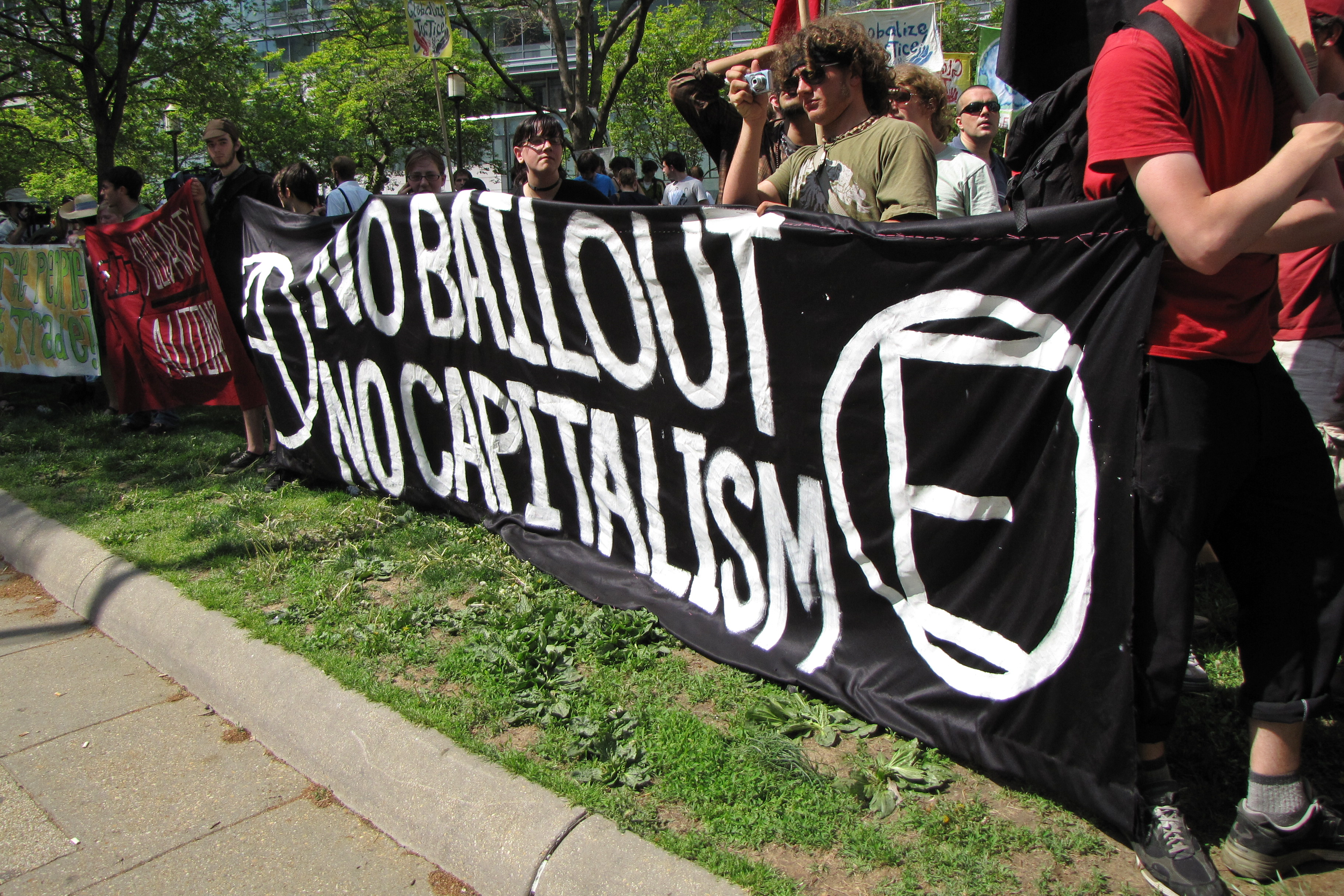
Anti-IMF protest in April of 2009

Globalization, since World War II, is partly the result of planning by politicians to break down borders hampering trade. Their work led to the Bretton Woods Conference, an agreement by the world's leading politicians to lay down the framework for international commerce and finance, and the founding of several international institutions intended to oversee the processes of globalization. Globalization was also driven by the global expansion of multinational corporations based in the United States and Europe, and worldwide exchange of new developments in science, technology and products, with most significant inventions of this time having their origins in the Western world according to Encyclopædia Britannica. Worldwide export of western culture went through the new mass media: film, radio and television and recorded music. Development and growth of international transport and telecommunication played a decisive role in modern globalization.

These institutions include the International Bank for Reconstruction and Development (the World Bank), and the International Monetary Fund. Globalization has been facilitated by advances in technology which have reduced the costs of trade, and trade negotiation rounds, originally under the auspices of the General Agreement on Tariffs and Trade (GATT), which led to a series of agreements to remove restrictions on free trade.

Since World War II, barriers to international trade have been considerably lowered through international agreements – GATT. Particular initiatives carried out as a result of GATT and the World Trade Organization (WTO), for which GATT is the foundation, have included:

- Promotion of free trade:
  - Elimination of tariffs; creation of free trade zones with small or no tariffs
  - Reduced transportation costs, especially resulting from development of containerization for ocean shipping.
  - Reduction or elimination of capital controls
  - Reduction, elimination, or harmonization of subsidies for local businesses
  - Creation of subsidies for global corporations
  - Harmonization of intellectual property laws across the majority of states, with more restrictions
  - Supranational recognition of intellectual property restrictions (e.g. patents granted by China would be recognized in the United States)

Cultural globalization, driven by communication technology and the worldwide marketing of Western cultural industries, was understood at first as a process of homogenization, as the global domination of American culture at the expense of traditional diversity. However, a contrasting trend soon became evident in the emergence of movements protesting against globalization and giving new momentum to the defense of local uniqueness, individuality, and identity.

The Uruguay Round (1986 to 1994) led to a treaty to create the WTO to mediate trade disputes and set up a uniform platform of trading. Other bilateral and multilateral trade agreements, including sections of Europe's Maastricht Treaty and the North American Free Trade Agreement (NAFTA) have also been signed in pursuit of the goal of reducing tariffs and barriers to trade.

World exports rose from 8.5% in 1970, to 16.2% of total gross world product in 2001.

In the 1990s, the growth of low cost communication networks allowed work done using a computer to be moved to low wage locations for many job types. This included accounting, software development, and engineering design. In late 2000s, much of the industrialized world entered into a deep recession. Some analysts said in 2009 the world was going through a period of deglobalization after years of increasing economic integration. The 21st century melting of the Arctic will affect global trade, as it is paving the way for shorter trade routes. China has become the world's largest exporter surpassing Germany.

== See also ==
- History of capitalism
- Human history
- Military globalization
- International relations since 1989
