= Interstate system =

Interstate system may refer to:

- A system for international relations
- Interstate Highway System, a network of controlled-access highways in the United States
- Interstate system (world-systems theory), a specific theory of state relationships within world-systems theory.
