= Interstate system (world-systems theory) =

Concept of states defined by relationships to others

The interstate system is a concept used within world-systems theory to describe the system of state relationships that arose either as a concomitant process or as a consequence of the development of the capitalist world-system over the course of the "long" 16th century. The theory of the interstate system holds that all states are defined through their relationship to other states or through participation in the world economy, and that divisions between states help to divide the world into a core, periphery and semi-periphery.

== Concepts ==
=== Development of an interstate system ===
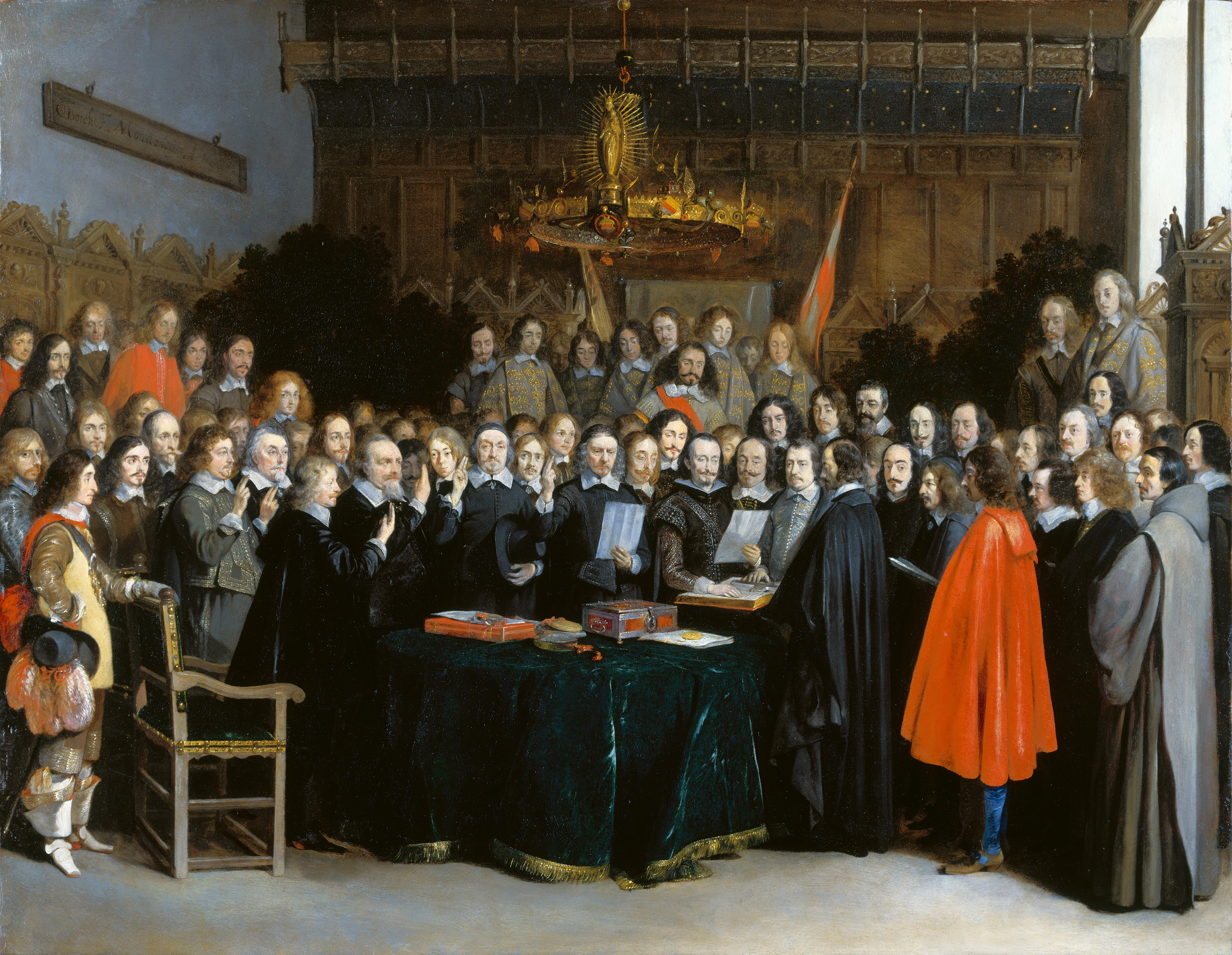
The Peace of Westphalia marked an important restructure of the interstate system, including the widespread recognition of the sovereignty of the United Provinces, the first global hegemon.

Immanuel Wallerstein wrote that the development of a capitalist world-economy created all of the major institutions of the modern world, including social classes, nations, households and states. These institutions also created each other, as nations, classes, and households came to be defined by their relations to the state, and were subsequently able to shape the state. Out of this structural chaos on a sub-state level, the basic elements of a state could emerge, but states could only gain conscious recognition when other states were able to define and relate to them.

To Wallerstein, there were no concrete rules about what exactly constitutes an individual state beyond this, as there were so many exceptions to various indicators of statehood. Juridical sovereignty could range from total to nil, as could the state's ability to impose decisions, project power, or control the flows of capital, commodities and labor. There were also no clear rules about which group controlled the state, as various groups located inside, outside, and across the states’ frontiers could seek to increase or decrease state power in order to better profit from a world-economy.

While on the level of individual states, almost nothing remained so stable as to assist with a definition of statehood, Wallerstein claimed that the "relative power continuum of stronger and weaker states has remained relatively unchanged over 400-odd years." While hegemons came and went, the basic division of the world into core and periphery has persisted. This implied to Wallerstein that while there is no universal state system, an interstate system had developed out of the sum of state actions, which existed to reinforce certain rules and preconditions of statehood. These rules included maintaining consistent relations of production, and regulating the flow of capital, commodities and labor across borders to maintain the price structures of the global market. If weak states attempt to rewrite these rules as they prefer them, strong states will typically intervene to rectify the situation.

The ideology of the interstate system is sovereign equality, and while the system generally presents a set of constraints on the power of individual states, states within the system are "neither sovereign nor equal." Not only do strong states impose their will on weak states, strong states also impose limitations upon other strong states, and tend to seek strengthened international rules, since enforcing consequences for broken rules can be highly beneficial and confer comparative advantages.

=== Relationship to nation and class ===
Wallerstein notes that class conflict within the context of an interstate system tends to take the form of creating institutions to affect state decisions, and that these institutions tend to be created within the boundaries of the state, and with a specific national scope. This has the effect of adding to the definiteness of state structures, and giving a national character to class conflict.

Both the proletariat and bourgeoisie can find benefits and drawbacks to defining themselves as "world classes." For example, the bourgeoisie has an interest in defining itself as a world class to overcome national barriers to trade, but also has an interest in tying itself to various state machineries to gain comparative advantages and monopoly privileges. Likewise the proletariat has an interest in uniting on a world scale to better combat internationally mobile capital, however the mechanisms most readily available for improving local conditions exist in state-based organizations. The result is that both classes express consciousness at a level which does not reflect their economic role within a world-economy. For this reason, class conflict is often expressed in other social terms, such as through bourgeois or revolutionary nationalism.

=== Role in Hegemonies and Liberalism ===
While Wallerstein said that "omnipotence does not exist within the interstate system," he did note that in "rare and unstable" instances, states could aspire to a hegemony over the world system. This generally requires a combined agro-industrial, commercial, and financial edge over their rivals, which has only been achieved by the Dutch Republic (1620–1672), the United Kingdom (1815–1873), and the United States (1945–1967). Such hegemonies coincide with expansions and contractions in the world economy, which Wallerstein explained through Kondratiev waves.

Once a hegemon has achieved control over the interstate system, they assume world "responsibilities" to maintain the interstate system, restricting conflicts between entrepreneurial, bureaucratic and working-class strata by exercising power in a "liberal" form. This takes the form of greater enforcement of interstate rules to maintain liberal norms and the hegemon's diplomatic, military, political, ideological, and cultural power. This delegitimizes the efforts of other state machineries to act against the hegemonic power. It is also self-defeating, in that it promotes the spread of technological expertise to other powers, and rising wages in the hegemon tends to decrease the competitiveness of its labor power.

=== Role in state socialist economies ===
World-systems theorists have used the interstate system to explain the perceived failures of the state socialist economies of the eastern bloc in abolishing commodity fetishism and other negative effects of a capitalist world-economy at the national level. This has included claims that since an interstate system is the basis of a competitive commodity economy at a system level, then no single state is capable of totally ending commodity exchange across its borders without failing to maintain state competitiveness. Wallerstein believed that the fact that the eastern bloc had largely avoided disrupting the world economy was proof of the effectiveness of the interstate system in disincentivizing global class conflict.

== Criticism ==
Wallerstein's use of the interstate system to explain international relations was criticised by a number of Western Marxists and non-Marxists for what they saw as economism, or for failing to account for "the relative autonomy of the state" from economic factors, claiming that Wallerstein saw the interstate system as a mechanical consequence of capital accumulation. While Wallerstein was quite clear that the interstate system followed the development of a world-economy, and state policies largely reflected internal pressures from economic actors, other world-systems theorists like Christopher Chase-Dunn view the interstate system and world-economy as concomitant processes with no clear causal priority.

== See also ==
- World-systems theory
- World-system
- Core countries
- Periphery countries
- Semi-periphery countries
