= Military globalization =

Military globalization is defined by David Held as "the process which embodies the growing extensity and intensity of military relations among the political units of the world-system. This perspective captures both the growing web of global military connections and the effect of key military technological innovations (from steamships to satellites), which have gradually reshaped the world into a unified geostrategic space. For Robert Keohane and Joseph Nye, military globalization entails 'long-distance networks of interdependence in which force, and the threat or promise of force, are employed". For historians Ángel Alcalde and José Escribano, war is "an intrinsic element of globalization".

Held divides the military globalization into three distinct phenomena:

1. The globalization of the war system. This refers to the "geopolitical order, great power rivalry, conflict and security relations".
2. The global system of arms production and transfers, reflected in the global arms dynamics.
3. The geo-governance of violence, "embracing the formal and informal international regulation of the acquisition, deployment and use of military force".

All three processes above "are connected to technological development, which made them possible in the first place. The result is increasing global interdependence and complexity".

The process of military globalization starts with the Age of Discovery, when the European colonial empires began military operations on the global scale. Their "imperial rivalry led to the First World War, which was the first global conflict in world history". Keohane dates military globalization at least from the time of the conquests of Alexander the Great.

As of 2025, only one book was devoted completely and explicitly to the subject. The author tells in "Preface":

The first version of this essay on globalization (2015) I contributed as a chapter to Wikipedia’s article Globalization. The Wikipedia Editors chose to create for this chapter a separate article, entitling it Military globalization. A year later, however the article was almost entirely deleted because Wikipedia is not a platform for original research. The Editors instructed to write basing only on works which explicitly deal with the subject. The complication was that there are almost no such works… All Wikipedia could find by 2017 sufficed for a stub article. Consequently, I decided to contact a publisher of original research. As to why, given so vast literature on globalization, military globalization today remains a field of original research is an intriguing question unto itself.

== See also ==
- List of countries with overseas military bases
- International relations
- Global policeman
- Power projection
- World government
- World war
- World War III
- Criticisms of globalization
