= World-system =

Socioeconomic system

A world-system is a socioeconomic system, under systems theory, that encompasses part or all of the globe, detailing the aggregate structural result of the sum of the interactions between polities. World-systems are usually larger than single states, but do not have to be global. The Westphalian System is the preeminent world-system operating in the contemporary world, denoting the system of sovereign states and nation-states produced by the Westphalian Treaties in 1648. Several world-systems can coexist, provided that they have little or no interaction with one another. Where such interactions becomes significant, separate world-systems merge into a new, larger world-system. Through the process of globalization, the modern world has reached the state of one dominant world-system, but in human history there have been periods where separate world-systems existed simultaneously, according to Janet Abu-Lughod. The most well-known version of the world-system approach has been developed by Immanuel Wallerstein. A world-system is a crucial element of the world-system theory, a multidisciplinary, macro-scale approach to world history and social change.

== Characteristics ==
World-systems are defined by the existence of a division of labor. The modern world-system has a multi-state political structure (the interstate system) and therefore its division of labor is international division of labor. In the modern world-system, the division of labor consists of three zones according to the prevalence of profitable industries or activities: core, semiperiphery, and periphery. Countries tend to fall into one or another of these interdependent zones core countries, semi-periphery countries and the periphery countries. Resources are redistributed from the underdeveloped, typically raw materials-exporting, poor part of the world (the periphery) to developed, industrialized core.

World-systems, past world-systems and the modern world-system, have temporal features. Cyclical rhythms represent the short-term fluctuation of economy, while secular trends mean deeper long run tendencies, such as general economic growth or decline. The term contradiction means a general controversy in the system, usually concerning some short term vs. long term trade-offs. For example, the problem of underconsumption, wherein the drive-down of wages increases the profit for the capitalists on the short-run, but considering the long run, the decreasing of wages may have a crucially harmful effect by reducing the demand for the product. The last temporal feature is the crisis: a crisis occurs, if a constellation of circumstances brings about the end of the system.

The world-systems theory stresses that world-systems (and not nation states) should be the basic unit of social analysis. Thus, we should focus not on individual states, but on the relations between their groupings (core, semi-periphery, and periphery).

== Immanuel Wallerstein ==
The most well-known version of the world-system approach has been developed by Immanuel Wallerstein, who has provided several definitions of what a world-system is, twice in 1974, first

"...a system is defined as a unit with a single division of labor and multiple cultural systems."

and second as

"…a social system, one that has boundaries, structures, member groups, rules of legitimation, and coherence."

In 1987, he elaborated his definition:

"...not the system of the world, but a system that is a world and which can be, most often has been, located in an area less than the entire globe. World-systems analysis argues that the units of social reality within which we operate, whose rules constrain us, are for the most part such world-systems [...]. ...there have been thus far only two varieties of world-systems: world-economies and world empires. A world-empire (examples, the Roman Empire, Han China) are large bureaucratic structures with a single political center and an axial division of labor, but multiple cultures. A world-economy is a large axial division of labor with multiple political centers and multiple cultures."

Thus, we can differentiate world-systems into politically unified (world-empires) and not unified (world-economies). Small, non-state units such as tribes are micro-systems.

== World system vs. world-system(s) ==
World system refers to the entire world, whereas world-system is its fragment - the largest unit of analysis that makes sense. Wallerstein stresses the importance of hyphen in the title:

"... In English, the hyphen is essential to indicate these concepts. "World system" without a hyphen suggests that there has been only one world-system in the history of the world."

There is an ongoing debate among scholars whether we can talk about multiple world-systems. For those who support the multiple world-systems approach, there have been many world-systems throughout worlds history, some replacing others, as was the case when a multipolar world-system of the 13th-14th centuries was replaced by a series of consecutive Europe- and the West-centered world-systems. Others coexisted unknowingly with others, not linked to them directly or indirectly; in those cases the world-systems weren't worldwide (for example, prior to colonization of Americas, the Americas world-systems had no connection with the one encompassing Eurasia and Africa). From around 19th century onward, due to the process of globalization, many scholars agree that there has been only one world-system, that of capitalism. There are, however, dissenting voices, as some scholars do not support the contention that there is only one world-system in the modern day; Janet Abu-Lughod states that multiple world-systems did exist in past epochs.

The alternative approach insists that there was only one World System that originated in the Near East five or even ten thousand years ago, and gradually encompassed the whole world; thus, the present-day truly global World System can be regarded as its continuation.

== See also ==
- Scale (analytical tool)
