= Globalization in the Philippines =

Globalization in the Philippines may be observed in various periods of the Philippine history on the developments of its economy and culture.

In the history of globalization, during the archaic globalization, kingdoms and polities in the archipelago, such as the Kingdom of Maynila, have exchanges with the people in the region through the Spice trade. Proto-globalization began during the Spanish colonization of the Philippines with the Manila galleon.

The Philippines is a member of the United Nations.

== History ==
=== Pre-colonial period (900 AD to 1565) ===
==== Spice trade ====
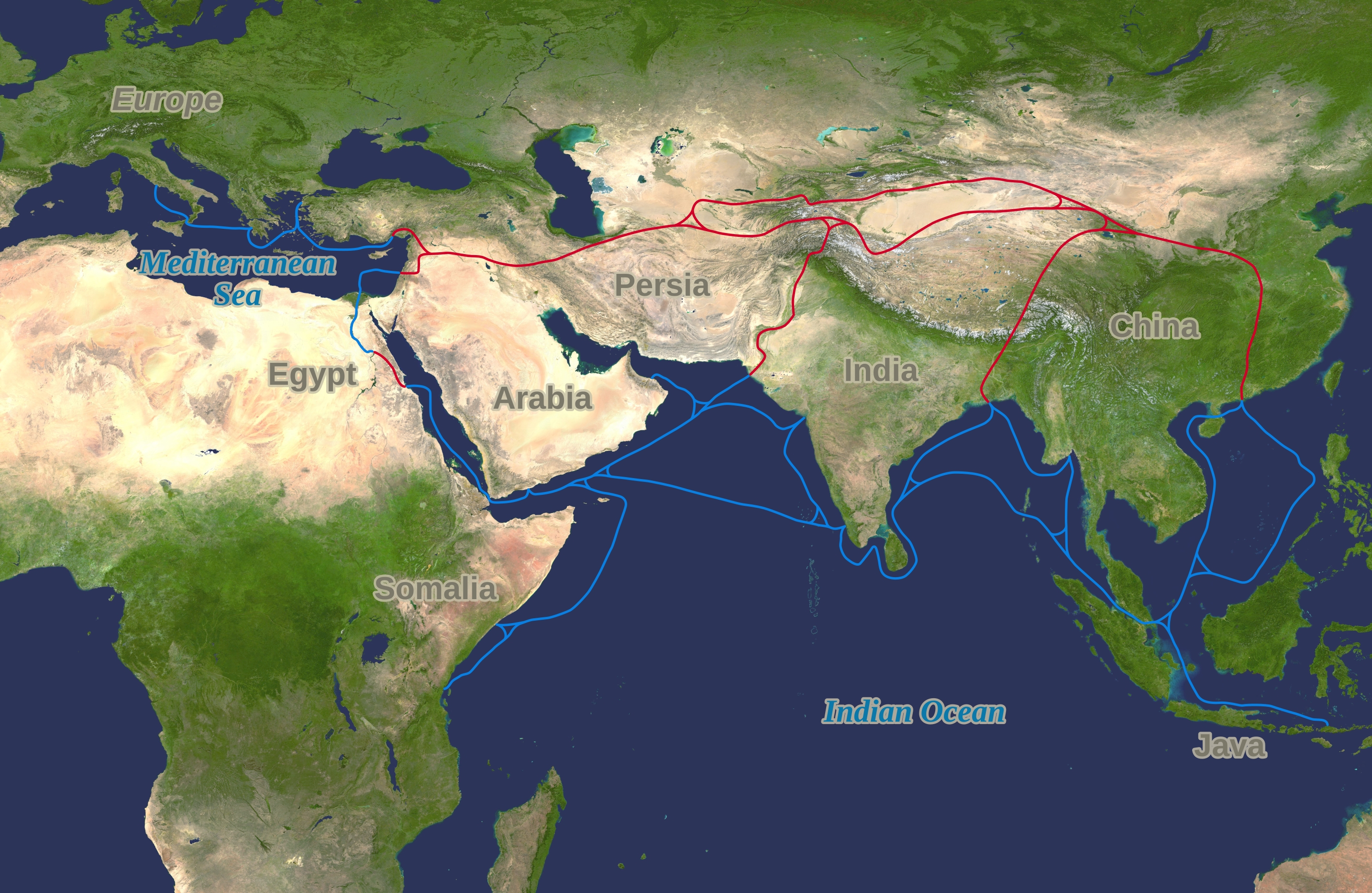
The Silk Road (red) and spice trade routes (blue)

The spice trade involved historical civilizations in Asia, Northeast Africa and Europe. Spices, such as cinnamon, cassia, cardamom, ginger, pepper, nutmeg, star anise, clove, and turmeric, were known and used in antiquity and traded in the Eastern world. These spices found their way into the Near East before the beginning of the Christian era, with fantastic tales hiding their true sources.

The maritime aspect of the trade was dominated by the Austronesian peoples in Southeast Asia, namely the ancient Indonesian sailors who established routes from Southeast Asia to Sri Lanka and India, and later China, by 1500 BC. These goods were then transported by land toward the Mediterranean and the Greco-Roman world via the incense route and the Roman–India routes by India and Persia traders. The Austronesian maritime trade lanes later expanded into the Middle East and East Africa by the 1st millennium AD, resulting in the Austronesian colonization of Madagascar.

Within specific regions, Somalia (5th century BC – 11th century AD) had pioneered the Red Sea route before the 1st century AD. During the first millennium AD, Somalis became the maritime trading power of the Red Sea. By this period, trade routes existed from Sri Lanka (the Roman Taprobane) and India, which had acquired maritime technology from early Austronesian contact. By the mid-7th century AD, after the rise of Islam, Arab traders started plying these maritime routes and dominated the western Indian Ocean maritime routes.

Arab traders eventually took over conveying goods via the Levant and Venetian merchants to Europe until the rise of the Seljuk Turks in 1090. Later the Ottoman Turks held the route again by 1453. Overland routes helped the spice trade initially, but maritime trade routes led to tremendous growth in commercial activities to Europe.

The trade was changed by the Crusades and later the European Age of Discovery, during which the spice trade, particularly in black pepper, became an influential activity for European traders. From the 11th to the 15th centuries, the Italian maritime republics of Venice and Genoa monopolized the trade between Europe and Asia. The Cape Route from Europe to the Indian Ocean via the Cape of Good Hope was pioneered by the Portuguese explorer navigator Vasco da Gama in 1498, resulting in new maritime routes for trade.

This trade, which drove world trade from the end of the Middle Ages well into the Renaissance, ushered in an age of European domination in the East. Channels such as the Bay of Bengal served as bridges for cultural and commercial exchanges between diverse cultures as nations struggled to gain control of the trade along the many spice routes. In 1571 the Spanish opened the first trans-Pacific route between its territories of the Philippines and Mexico, served by the Manila Galleon. This trade route lasted until 1815. The Portuguese trade routes were mainly restricted and limited by the use of ancient routes, ports, and nations that were difficult to dominate. The Dutch were later able to bypass many of these problems by pioneering a direct ocean route from the Cape of Good Hope to the Sunda Strait in Indonesia.

=== Spanish period (1565 to 1898) ===
==== Manila galleon ====
The Manila galleon trade route was a Spanish trade route linking the Philippines in the Spanish East Indies to Mexico (New Spain), across the Pacific Ocean, in use from 1565 to 1815. This route was plied by sailing ships or galleons i.e. the Manila galleons (Spanish: Galeón de Manila; Tagalog: Galeon ng Maynila) that made one or two round-trip voyages per year between Manila and Acapulco.

The route was inaugurated in 1565 after the Augustinian friar and navigator Andrés de Urdaneta pioneered the tornaviaje or return route from the Philippines to Mexico. Urdaneta and Alonso de Arellano made the first successful round trips that year, by taking advantage of the Kuroshio Current. The galleons set sail from Cavite, in Manila Bay, at the end of June or the first week of July, sailing through the northern Pacific and reaching Acapulco in March to April of the next calendar year. The return route from Acapulco passes through lower latitudes closer to the equator, stopping over in the Marianas, then sailing onwards through the San Bernardino Strait off Cape Espiritu Santo in Samar and then to Manila Bay and anchoring again off Cavite by June or July. The trade using "Urdaneta's route" lasted until 1815, when the Mexican War of Independence broke out. The majority of these galleons were built and loaded in shipyards in Cavite, utilizing native hardwoods like the Philippine teak, with sails produced in Ilocos, and with the rigging and cordage made from salt-resistant Manila hemp. The vast majority of the galleon's crew consisted of Filipino natives; many of whom were farmers, street children, or vagrants press-ganged into service as sailors. The officers and other skilled crew were usually Spaniards (a high percentage of whom were of Basque descent). The galleons were state vessels and thus the cost of their construction and upkeep was borne by the Spanish Crown.

The galleons mostly carried cargoes of Chinese and other Asian luxury goods in exchange for New World silver. Silver prices in Asia were substantially higher than in America, leading to an arbitrage opportunity for the Manila galleon. Every space of the galleons was packed tightly with cargo, even spaces outside the holds like the decks, cabins, and magazines. In extreme cases, they towed barges filled with more goods. While this resulted in slow passage (which sometimes resulted in shipwrecks or turning back), the profit margins were so high that it was commonly practiced. These goods included Indian ivory and precious stones, Chinese silk and porcelain, cloves from the Moluccas islands, cinnamon, ginger, lacquers, tapestries and perfumes from all over Asia. In addition, slaves (collectively known as "chinos") from various parts of Asia (mainly slaves bought from the Portuguese slave markets and Muslim captives from the Spanish–Moro conflict) were also transported from the Manila slave markets to Mexico. Free indigenous Filipinos also migrated to Mexico via the galleons (including galleon crew that jumped ship), comprising the majority of free Asian settlers ("chinos libres") in Mexico, particularly in regions near the terminal ports of the Manila galleons. The route also fostered cultural exchanges that shaped the identities and the culture of the countries involved.

The Manila galleons were also known colloquially in New Spain as La Nao de China ("The China Ship") because they carried mostly Chinese goods shipped from Manila. The Manila Galleon route was an early instance of globalization, representing a trade route from Asia that crossed to the Americas, thereby connecting all the world's continents in global silver trade.

In 2015, the Philippines and Mexico began preparations for the nomination of the Manila–Acapulco Galleon Trade Route in the UNESCO World Heritage List with backing from Spain, which has also suggested the tri-national nomination of the archives on the Manila–Acapulco Galleons in the UNESCO Memory of the World Register.

==== Spanish Education ====
During the Spanish colonial period in the Philippines (1565–1898), the different cultures of the archipelago experienced a gradual unification from a variety of native Asian and Islamic customs and traditions, including animist religious practices, to what is known today as Filipino culture, a unique hybrid of Southeast Asian and Western culture, namely Spanish, including the Spanish language and the Catholic faith.

Spanish education played a major role in that transformation in the Philippines. The oldest universities, colleges, and vocational schools, dating as far back as the late 16th century were created during the colonial period, as well as the first modern public education system in Asia, established in 1863. By the time Spain was replaced by the United States as the colonial power, Filipinos were among the most educated peoples in all of Asia and the Pacific, boasting one of the highest literacy rates in that continent. Simultaneously, the knowledge of Filipinos about neighboring cultures receded.

=== American period (1898 to 1946) ===
==== Payne–Aldrich Tariff Act ====
The Payne–Aldrich Tariff Act of 1909 (ch. 6, 36 Stat. 11), sometimes referred to as the Tariff of 1909, is a United States federal law that amended the United States tariff schedules to raise certain tariffs on goods entering the United States. It is named for U.S. representative Sereno E. Payne of New York and U.S. senator Nelson W. Aldrich of Rhode Island.

The tariff began as a measure to enact the "tariff modification" plank of the Republican Party platform, which appealed to exporters, particularly Midwestern farmers and agriculture interests, and was understood by most contemporaries to mean a reduction in most rates. Although the final bill included provisions for a commission to study rates and free trade with the Philippines, it increased rates on most goods, angering progressives, who argued that high protective rates promoted monopoly, and led to a deep split in the Republican Party which culminated in the 1912 presidential primaries. The legislative debate over the bill also led directly to the adoption of a federal income tax via the Sixteenth Amendment to the United States Constitution.

==== American education ====
During the United States colonial period of the Philippines (1898–1946), the United States government was in charge of providing education in the Philippines.

=== Japanese period ===
==== Greater East Asia Co-Prosperity Sphere ====
The Greater East Asia Co-Prosperity Sphere (Japanese: 大東亜共栄圏, Hepburn: Dai Tōa Kyōeiken; Kyujitai: 大東亞共榮圈), also known as the GEACPS, was a pan-Asian union that the Empire of Japan tried to establish. Initially, it covered Japan (including annexed Korea), Manchukuo, and China, but as the Pacific War progressed, it also included territories in Southeast Asia and parts of India. The term was first coined by Minister for Foreign Affairs Hachirō Arita on June 29, 1940.

The proposed objectives of this union were to ensure economic self-sufficiency and cooperation among the member states, along with resisting the influence of Western imperialism and Soviet communism. In reality, militarists and nationalists saw it as an effective propaganda tool to enforce Japanese hegemony. The latter approach was reflected in a document released by Japan's Ministry of Health and Welfare, An Investigation of Global Policy with the Yamato Race as Nucleus, which promoted Japanese supremacist theories. Japanese spokesmen openly described the Greater East Asia Co-Prosperity Sphere as a device for the "development of the Japanese race." When World War II ended, the Greater East Asia Co-Prosperity Sphere became a source of criticism and scorn for the Allies.

=== Contemporary period ===
The principle of an independent foreign policy can be found in the Philippine Constitution

The State shall pursue an independent foreign policy. In its relations with other states, the paramount consideration shall be national sovereignty, territorial integrity, national interest, and the right to self-determination.

— 1987 Constitution

The Department of Foreign Affairs (DFA) expressed in an interview that the Philippine sovereignty should not be compromised in international cooperations.

=== International organizations ===
The Philippines is a member of the United Nations (UN), Association of Southeast Asian Nations (ASEAN), Asia-Pacific Economic Cooperation (APEC), and other organizations.

=== Sister cities ===
Local Government Units in the Philippines may enter into sister-city agreements with cities in other countries through the guidelines provided by the Department of Interior and Local Government (DILG)

== Economy ==
=== Business process outsourcing ===
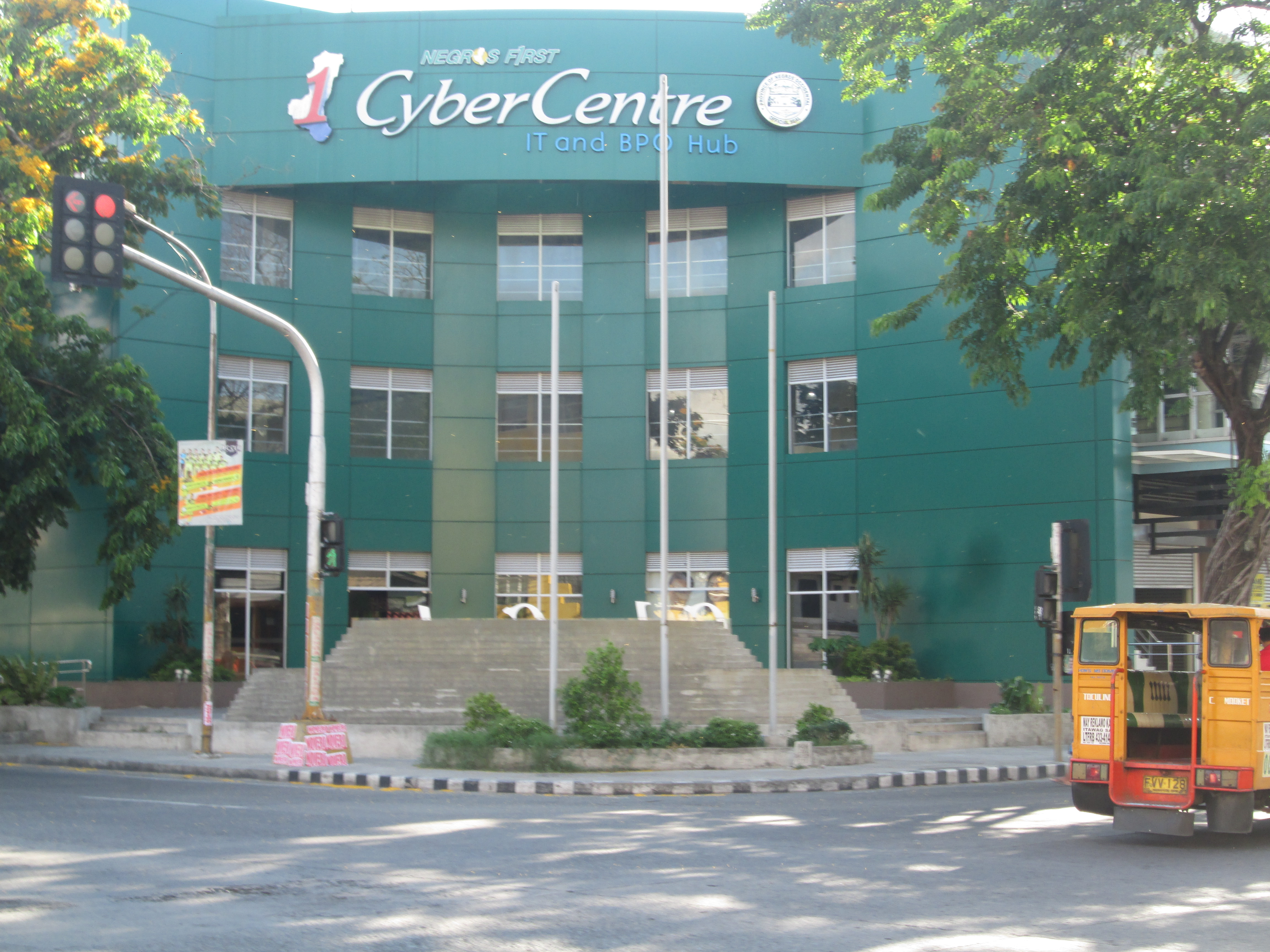
Negros first CyberCentre IT and BPO рub in Bacolod, Philippines

One of the most dynamic and fastest growing sectors in the Philippines is the information technology–business process outsourcing (IT-BPO) industry. The industry is composed of eight sub-sectors, namely, knowledge process outsourcing and back offices, animation, call centers, software development, game development, engineering design, and medical transcription. The IT-BPO industry plays a major role in the country's growth and development.

=== Overseas Filipino Worker ===
Overseas Filipino Worker (OFW) is a term often used to refer to Filipino migrant workers, people with Filipino citizenship who reside in another country for a limited period of employment. The number of these workers was roughly 1.77 million between April and September 2020. Of these, female workers comprised a larger portion, making up 59.6 percent, or 1.06 million. However, this number declined to 405.62 thousand between 2019 and 2020. From April to September 2025, the number of OFWs had recovered to an estimated 2.05 million per the Philippine Statistics Authority's 2025 Survey on Overseas Filipinos, while total remittances for the period reached ₱240.73 billion.

OFW money remittances to relatives in the Philippines are a major contributor to the Philippine economy, reaching a total of P1.9 trillion in 2022, which represented some 8.9% of the Philippines' Gross Domestic Product.

=== Special Economic Zones ===
Special Economic Zones in the Philippines are created by the Congress of the Philippines through legislative enactments and by President of the Philippines through presidential proclamation. Special Economic Zones which include free trade zones and free ports are managed by the Philippine Economic Zone Authority (PEZA). The zones are created to promote investment in export-oriented manufacturing industry into the country by assisting investors in registering and facilitating their business operations and providing tax incentives.

=== Tourism ===
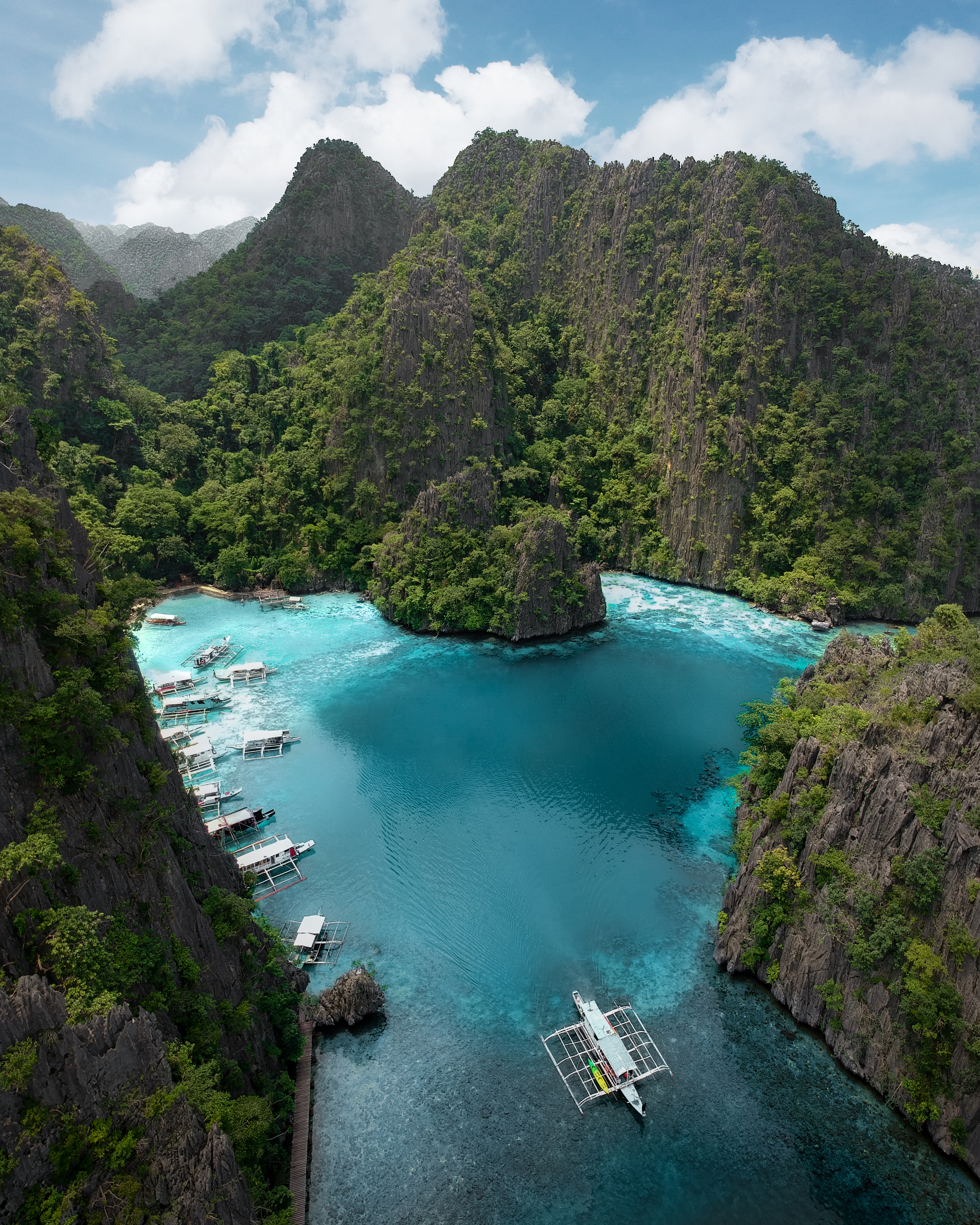
Palawan, which includes Coron, is a UNESCO Biosphere Reserve.

Tourism is an important sector for the Philippine economy. The travel and tourism industry contributed 8.1% to the country's GDP in 2025; this was lower than the 12.7% recorded in 2019 prior to the COVID-19 lockdowns. Coastal tourism, encompassing beach and diving activities, constitutes 25% of the Philippines' tourism revenue, serving as its primary income source in the sector. Popular destinations among tourists include Boracay, Palawan, Cebu and Siargao. While the Philippines has encountered political and social challenges that have affected its tourism industry, the country has also taken steps to address these issues. Over the past years, there have been efforts to improve political stability, enhance security measures, and promote social inclusivity, all of which contribute to creating a more favorable environment for tourism, such as the Boracay rehabilitation.

== Culture ==
Philippine Culture is influenced by globalization through Filipino interactions with foreign nationals or through the consumption of media. Philippine mass media has been influenced by telenovela and Korean drama.

=== Social media ===
Social networking is one of the most active web-based activities in the Philippines, with Filipinos being declared as the most active users on a number of web-based social media sites such as Facebook, Instagram, Snapchat, and Twitter. The use of social networking websites has become so extensive in the Philippines that the country has been tagged as "The Social Media Capital of the World," and has also become part of Filipino Internet culture. Subsequently, social media is also used in the Philippines as a form of election campaign material, as well as tools to aid criminal investigation.

== Language ==
Philippine languages are influenced through interactions with foreign nationals through trade and culture. The Filipino language contains loan words from the Spanish language due to centuries of Spanish colonialism. English words are used in code-switching and/or code-mixing in the use of Philippine Languages such as Taglish, Bislish, Hokaglish, and Chavacano.

The Komisyon sa Wikang Filipino is against the use of code-switching such as taglish.

== Education ==
K–12 implementation in the Philippines started on May 20, 2008, during the administration of President Gloria Macapagal Arroyo with the filing of Omnibus Education Reform Act of 2008 by Mar Roxas, and further emphasized by the 2008 ASEAN Charter on December 15, 2008. As part of the 9-year process of the new curriculum, Kindergarten became mandatory on June 6, 2011, during the presidency of Arroyo's successor Benigno Aquino III, as a requirement for the effectivity of K–12 and the phasing out the 1945–2017 K–4th Year system on April 24 of the following year. The new curriculum then became effective on the said date of April 2012, starting with School Year (SY) 2012–2013. To maintain K–12's continuity, the Kindergarten Education Act of 2012 and Enhanced Basic Education Act of 2013 (Republic Act Nos. 10157 and 10533) were signed into law by President Benigno Aquino III on January 20, 2012 and May 15, 2013, respectively. The K–12 process spanned for 9 years and three Philippine presidents from Arroyo in May 2008 until K–4th Year was entirely phased out during the administration of Rodrigo Duterte on June 5, 2017. It aimed to align the Philippine education system with international standards and better prepare students for employment, entrepreneurship, or higher education.

=== Philippine Qualifications Framework ===
The Philippine Qualification Framework (PQF) is the national level qualifications framework used in the Philippines.

The Philippines, as a member of the Association of Southeast Asian Nations (ASEAN), adopts the ASEAN Qualifications Reference Framework (AQRF) to link national qualifications framework across ASEAN member states.

The PQF is implemented by the Department of Education (DepEd), Technical Education and Skills Development Authority (TESDA), Commission on Higher Education (CHED), Professional Regulation Commission (PRC), Department of Labor and Employment (DOLE), Department of Interior and Local Government (DILG), and Department of Trade and Industry (DTI).

== See also ==
- Globalization in China
- Globalization in India
- Globalization in South Korea
