= Vocational education in the Philippines =

In the Philippines, vocational education, also referred to as technical-vocational education and training (TVET), is the development of technical and practical skills for employment. It is primarily implemented by the Technical Education and Skills Development Authority (TESDA), while in basic education it is conducted in partnership with the Department of Education (DepEd).

== History ==
On December 3, 1927, the Philippines approved Act No. 3377, promoting agriculture and vocational education, which is introduced vocational education in the Philippine education system.

In 1991, the Philippine Congress through the Joint Resolution No. 2 created the Congressional Commission for Education (EDCOM) which then recommended the trifocalization of Philippine Education.

On August 15, 1994, the enactment of Republic Act No. 7796 created the Technical Education and Skills Development Authority (TESDA) which focuses on the National Technical Education and Skills Development Plan. Prior to the enactment of the law are the National Manpower and Youth Council (NMYC) of the Department of Labor and Employment (DOLE), the Bureau of Technical and Vocational Education (BTVE) of the Department of Education, Culture and Sports (DECS), and the Apprenticeship Program of the Bureau of Local Employment of DOLE.

On November 21, 2014, Republic Act No. 10647 or the "Ladderized Education Act of 2014" was approved which defines the Philippine Qualifications Framework (PQF) as "a national policy which describes the levels of educational qualifications and sets the standards for qualification outcomes" and furthermore "It is a quality assured national system for the development, recognition and award of qualifications based on standards of knowledge, skills and values acquired in different ways and methods by learners and workers of a certain country". The PQF is a qualifications framework in the national level which has counterparts in other countries such as the Australian Qualifications Framework (AQF), Malaysian Qualifications Framework (MQF), and Scottish Credit and Qualifications Framework (SCQF)

On January 16, 2018, Republic Act No. 10968 or the "PQF Act" was approved which institutionalizes the Philippine Qualifications Framework and created the Philippine Qualifications Framework-National Coordinating Council (PQF-NCC)

On February 7, 2018, Republic Act No. 10970 or An Act Declaring the Twenty-Fifth Day of August of Every Year as the National Tech-Voc Day was approved. The activities for the National Tech-Voc Day shall be implemented by the TESDA ad DepEd as lead agencies.

On July 23, 2022, Republic Act No. 11899 lapsed into law which then created the Second Congressional Commission on Education which then provided reports on Education in the Philippines.

On November 7, 2024, Republic Act No. 12063, or the "Enterprise-Based Education and Training (EBET) Framework Act", was approved.

On October 23, 2025, Republic Act No. 12313 or the "Lifelong Learning Development Framework (LLDF) Act", which amends the "PQF Act", was approved. On June 25, 2026, the Implementing Rules and Regulations (IRR) of Republic Act No. 12313 was signed.

== Statistics ==
Year	Enrolled	Graduated	Assessed	Certified	Reference
2020	802,218	715,158	493,018	462,189	
2021	1,240,099	1,157,189	637,659	586,327	
2022	1,260,244	1,231,284	907,244	844,368	
2023	1,633,393	1,428,724	1,043,601	973,563	
2024	1,616,772	1,450,008	1,302,379	1,221,030	

== Basic Education ==
Republic Act No. 10533 or the "Enhanced Basic Education Act of 2013" introduced the K to 12 curriculum in Philippine Education which is then gradually implemented by the Department of Education (DepEd). In the implementation of the K to 12 Curriculum, students are allowed to choose the different tracks such as the Technical-Vocational-Livelihood (TVL) Track, Academic Track, Arts and Design Track, and Sports Track which is then decreased into two tracks.

Students in Basic Education particularly those in Senior High School may take TESDA Assessment and in 2026 approximately 190,000 students have undergone national competency assessments and received National Certificate according to their track.

=== Strengthened SHS Program ===
In the Strengthened SHS Program the Department of Education decreased the offered tracks into the Technical-Professional (TechPro) Track and the Academic Track. Under the new curriculum the maximum number of hours for work immersion is increased from 320 to 640 hours depending on the track.

== Enterpirse-Based Education and Training ==
The Enterpirse-Based Education and Training (EBET) Programs are developed by the Technical Education and Skills Development Authority in partnership with TESDA recognized industry boards The framework allows enterprises to conduct apprenticeship and upskilling programs which connects current industry practices to classroom instruction.

== Assessment and Certification ==
Upon completion of a module or course, the student receives a Certificate of Completion but must pass a TESDA Assessment to receive a National Certification.

=== National Certification ===
TESDA issues a National Certificate (NC) upon passing a competency assessment and the Certificate is recognized nationwide and in other countries for employment. Assessment is done by TESDA-accredited assessment centers, TESDA Regional and Provincial Offices, and TESDA TVET Institution-Assessment Centers.

Examples of National Certification are the following:

- Caregiving NC II
- Cookery NC II
- Housekeeping NC II
- Electrical Installation and Maintenance NC II
- Shielded Metal Arc Welding (SMAW) NC II
- Automotive Servicing NC II
- Computer Systems Servicing NC II
- Plumbing NC II
- Bartending NC II

== TVET Trainers ==
To become TESDA Certified Trainers, teachers are required to take the Trainers Methodology I.

== TESDA Online Program ==
TESDA offers free education online.

== See also ==
- Education in the Philippines
- Overseas Filipino Worker
- Vocational education in the United States
