= Education in Tacloban =

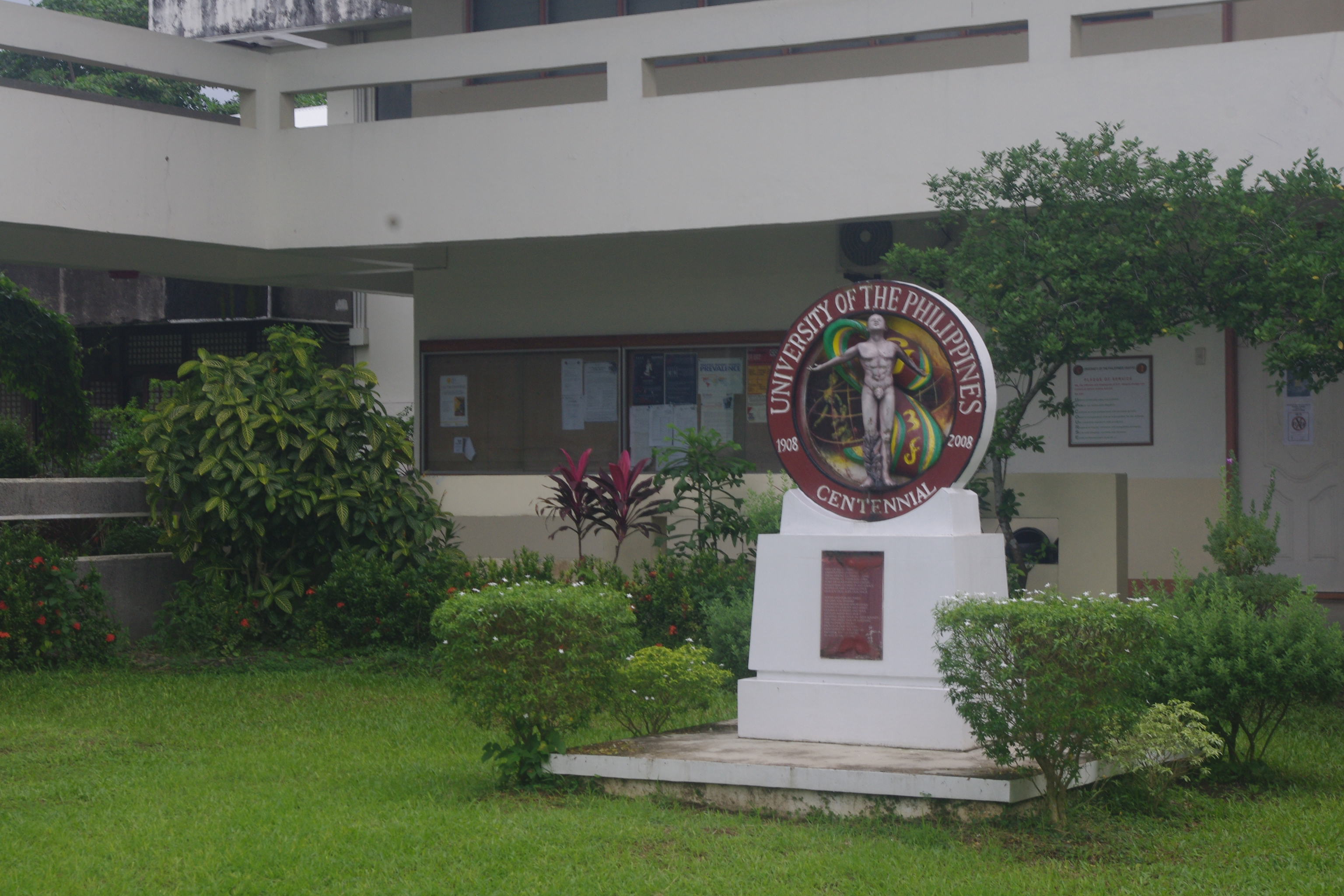
Tacloban College in 2016

Tacloban, Philippines, has a variety of public and private educational institutions. Foremost of these are the University of the Philippines in the Visayas - Tacloban College, Eastern Visayas State University, the Leyte Progressive High School, a provincial branch of the Technical Education and Skills Development Authority, the Leyte Normal University, the Liceo del Verbo Divino formerly known as the Divine Word University of Tacloban and the St. Therese Educational Foundation of Tacloban, Inc. otherwise known as STEFTI.

== List of schools and universities ==
=== Elementary ===
Public schools

- Anibong Elementary School
- Bagacay Elementary School
- Basper Elementary School
- Bayanihan Elementary School
- Bliss Elementary School
- Cabalawan Elementary School
- Caibaan Elementary School
- Camansihay Elementary School
- City Central School
- Diit Mercyville Primary School
- Don Vicente Quintero Memorial School
- Dr. A. P. Bañez Memorial School
- Fisherman's Village Elementary School
- Greendale Residences Integrated School
- Guadalupe Heights Integrated School
- Judge Antonio R. Montilla Elem. School
- Kapangian Central School
- Kapuso Village Integrated School
- Lorenzo Daa Memorial School
- Lucio Vivero Central School
- Manlurip Elementary School
- Marasbaras Central School
- New Hope Elementary School
- North Hill Arbours Integrated School
- Nula-Tula Elementary School
- Old Kawayan Elementary School
- Palanog Elementary School
- Palanog Resettlement School
- Panalaron Central School
- Rizal Central School
- RTR Primary School
- Ridgeview Park Integrated School
- Sagkahan Central School
- Salvacion Elementary School
- San Fernando Central School
- San Jose Central School
- San Roque Elementary School
- Scandinavian Elementary School
- Sta. Elena Elementary School
- Sto. Niño Elementary School
- Santo Niño SPED Center
- Tagpuro Elementary School
- Tigbao-Diit Central School
- Utap Elementary School
- V&G Dela Cruz Memorial School

Private schools

- Alpha Omega Learning Center
- Arc Angelus Civitas School, Inc.
- Asian Development Foundation
- Blessed Joseph Freinademetz Kinder
- Bright Sparks International
- CIE British School Tacloban (International School)
- Eastern Visayas College Prep. School
- Genesis Learning Institute of Eastern Visayas Inc.
- Grace Baptist Academy
- Holy Infant College
- Holy Virgin of Salvacion School, Inc.
- JE Mondejar Foundation College
- Jansen Heights Learning Foundation
- Kiddie Home Child Development Inc.
- Liceo del Verbo Divino
- Our Lady of Lourdes School foundation
- Penarada Tutorial Center
- Perpetual Help Learning Center
- Regional Continuing Educ (SPED)
- Sacred Heart College of Tacloban
- St. Agnes Educational Foundation
- St. Anthony SPED Center Foundation, Inc.
- St. Lawrence Xavier Early Academy House, Inc.
- St. Therese Educational Foundation of Tacloban, Inc.
- St. Therese Christian Development Center Foundation, Inc.
- St. Therese Educational Center of Leyte
- Tacloban Angelicum Learning Center
- Tacloban City Adventist School
- United Church Family Life Program

=== Secondary ===
Public schools

- Anibong National High School
- Anibong Night High School
- Antonio Balmes National High School
- Cirilo Roy Montejo National High School
- Cirilo Roy Montejo Night High School
- Greendale Residences Integrated School
- Guadalupe Heights Integrated School
- Kapuso Village Integrated School
- Leyte National High School
- North Hill Arbours Integrated School
- Marasbaras National High School
- Northern Tacloban City National High School
- Ridge View Park Integrated School
- San Jose National High School
- San Jose Night High School
- Sagkahan National High School
- Scandinavian National High School
- St. Francis Integrated School
- Sto. Niño Senior High School
- Tacloban City Night High School
- Tacloban National Agricultural School
- V&G National High School

Private schools

- ABE International Business College
- AMA Computer College Tacloban (currently located in nearby Palo, Leyte)
- Asian Development Foundation College
- Bethel International School
- Eastern Visayas College Preparatory School
- Grace Baptist Academy
- Holy Infant College
- Holy Virgin of Salvacion School, Inc.
- JE Mondejar Foundation College
- Liceo del Verbo Divino (formerly "Divine Word University of Tacloban")
- Sacred Heart College of Tacloban
- St. Therese Educational Center of Leyte (STECL)
- St. Therese Christian Development Center Foundation, Inc. (STCDCFI)
- St. Therese Educational Foundation of Tacloban, Inc. (STEFTI)
- Tacloban Angelicum Learning Center
- Tacloban Montessori High School

=== Colleges/Universities/Technical Vocational Institutes ===
- ABE International Business College Tacloban
- ACLC College of Tacloban
- AMA College Tacloban (currently located in nearby Palo, Leyte)
- Asia Pacific Career College
- Asian Development Foundation College
- Colegio De La Salle Fondation de Tacloban, Inc.
- Datamex Institute of Computer Technology Tacloban City
- Dr. Vicente Orestes Romualdez Educational Foundation (College of Law)
- Eastern Visayas State University
- Holy Infant College
- Holy Spirit Foundation College, Inc.
- Holy Virgin of Salvacion Foundation College, Inc.
- Innovate Information and Communications Technology Systems, Inc.
- JE Mondejar Foundation College
- Jose Navarro Polytechnic Institute
- Leyte Colleges
- Leyte Normal University
- Leyte School of Professionals
- National Maritime Polytechnic
- Remedios Trinidad Romualdez Medical Foundation
- Sacred Heart School
- Saint Arnold Janssen College of Tacloban, Inc.
- Saint Paul School of Professional Studies (located in nearby Palo, Leyte)
- St. Scholastica's College, Tacloban (currently located in nearby Palo, Leyte)
- St. Benedict College of Tacloban, Inc.
- Technical Education and Skills Development Authority (TESDA)
- University of the Philippines Tacloban College
