= Philippine Qualifications Framework =

Qualifications framework in the Philippines

The Philippine Qualification Framework (PQF) is the national level qualifications framework used in the Philippines.

The Philippines, as a member of the Association of Southeast Asian Nations (ASEAN), adopts the ASEAN Qualifications Reference Framework (AQRF) to link national qualifications framework across ASEAN member states.

The PQF is implemented by the Department of Education (DepEd), Technical Education and Skills Development Authority (TESDA), Commission on Higher Education (CHED), Professional Regulation Commission (PRC), Department of Labor and Employment (DOLE), Department of Interior and Local Government (DILG), and Department of Trade and Industry (DTI).

== History ==
The Philippine Qualifications Framework was institutionalized through the issuance of Executive Order No. 83 by President Benigno S. Aquino III on October 1, 2012.

On November 21, 2014, Republic Act No. 10647 or the "Ladderized Education Act of 2014" was approved which defines the Philippine Qualifications Framework (PQF) as "a national policy which describes the levels of educational qualifications and sets the standards for qualification outcomes" and furthermore "It is a quality assured national system for the development, recognition and award of qualifications based on standards of knowledge, skills and values acquired in different ways and methods by learners and workers of a certain country".

On January 16, 2018, Republic Act No. 10968 or the "PQF Act" was approved which institutionalizes the Philippine Qualifications Framework and created the Philippine Qualifications Framework-National Coordinating Council (PQF-NCC)

On November 7, 2024, Republic Act No. 12063, or the "Enterprise-Based Education and Training (EBET) Framework Act", was approved.

On March 3, 2025, Republic Act No. 12124, or the "Expanded Tertiary Education and Accreditation Program (ETEEAP) Act, was approved.

On October 23, 2025, Republic Act No. 12313 or the "Lifelong Learning Development Framework (LLDF) Act", which amends the "PQF Act", was approved. The Secreatary of the Department of Interior and Local Government (DILG), and Secretary of the Department of Trade and Industry (DTI) are added to the PQF-NCC. On June 25, 2026, the Implementing Rules and Regulations (IRR) of Republic Act No. 12313 was signed.

== Levels ==
The Philippine Qualification Framework has eight levels of qualifications.

| Level | Qualification type | Knowledge, skills and values | Application | Degree of independence |
|---|---|---|---|---|
| Grade 12 | | Possess functional knowledge across a range of learning areas and technical skills in chosen career tracks with advanced competencies in communication; scientific, critical and creative thinking; and the use of technologies. Have an understanding of right and wrong; one's history and cultural heritage; and deep respect for self, others and their culture, and the environment. | Apply functional knowledge, technical skills and values in academic and real-life situations through sound reasoning, informed decision-making, and the judicious use of resources. | Apply skills in varied situations with minimal supervision. |
| I | National Certificate I | Knowledge and skills that are manual or concrete or practical and/or operational in focus. | Applied in activities that are set in a limited range of highly familiar and predictable contexts; involve straightforward, routine issues which are addressed by following set rules, guidelines or procedures. | In conditions where there is very close support, guidance or supervision; minimum judgment or discretion is needed. |
| II | National Certificate II | Knowledge and skills that are manual, practical and/or operational in focus with a variety of options. | Applied in activities that are set in a range of familiar predictable context; involve routine issues which are identified and addressed by selecting from and following a number of set rules, guidelines or procedures. | In conditions where there is substantial support, guidance or supervision; limited judgment or discretion is needed. |
| III | National Certificate III | Knowledge and skill that are a balance of theoretical and/or technical and practical. Work involves understanding the work process, contributing to problem solving, and making decisions to determine the process, equipment and materials to be used. | Applied in activities that are set in contexts with some unfamiliar or unpredictable aspects; involve routine and non-routine issues which are identified and addressed by interpreting and/or applying established guidelines or procedures with some variations. | Application at this level may involve individual responsibility or autonomy, and/or may involve some responsibility for others. Participation in teams including team or group coordination may be involved. |
| IV | National Certificate IV | Knowledge and skill that are mainly theoretical and/or abstract with significant depth in one or more areas; contributing to technical solutions of a non-routine or contingency nature; evaluation and analysis of current practices and the development of new criteria and procedures. | Applied in activities that are set in a range of contexts, most of which involve a number of unfamiliar and/or unpredictable aspects; involve largely non-routine issues which are addressed using guidelines or procedures which require interpretation and/or adaptation. | Work involve some leadership and guidance when organizing activities of self and others. |
| V | Diploma | Knowledge and skill that are mainly theoretical and/or abstract with significant depth in some areas together with wide-ranging, specialized technical, creative and conceptual skills. Perform work activities demonstrating breadth, depth and complexity in the planning and initiation of alternative approaches to skill and knowledge applications across a broad range of technical and/or management requirements, evaluation and coordination. | Applied in activities that are supervisory, complex and non-routine which require an extensive interpretation and/or adaptation/ innovation. | In conditions where there is broad guidance and direction, where judgment is required in planning and selecting appropriate equipment, services and techniques for self and other. Undertake work involving participation in the development of strategic initiatives, as well as personal responsibility and autonomy in performing complex technical operations or organizing others. |
| VI | Baccalaureate Degree | Demonstrated broad and coherent knowledge and skills in their field of study for professional work and lifelong learning. | Application in professional/creative work or research in a specialized field of discipline and/or further study. | Substantial degree of independence and or/in teams of related fields with minimal supervision. |
| VII | Post-Baccalaureate Program | Demonstrated advanced knowledge and skills in a specialized or multi-disciplinary field of study for professional practice, self-directed research and/or lifelong learning. | Applied in professional/creative work or research that requires self-direction and/or leadership in a specialized or multi-disciplinary professional work/research. | High substantial degree of independence that involves exercise of leadership and initiative individual work or in teams of multi-disciplinary field. |
| VIII | Doctoral Degree and Post-Doctoral Programs | Demonstrated highly advanced systematic knowledge and skills in highly specialized and/or complex multi-disciplinary field of learning for complex research and/or professional practice and/or for the advancement of learning. | Applied for professional leadership for innovation, research and/or development management in highly specialized or multi-disciplinary field. | Full independence in individual work and/or in teams of multi-disciplinary and more complex setting that demands leadership for research and creativity for strategic value added. Significant level of expertise-based autonomy and accountability. |

== National Coordinating Council ==
The Philippine Qualification Framework-National Coordinating Council (PQF-NCC) was created in the enactment of Republic Act No. 10968, or the "PQF Act", and two members are added by Republic Act No. 12313, or the "Lifelong Learning Development Framework (LLDF) Act". The PQF-NCC is composed of the following:

- The Secretary, DepED, as Chairperson;
- The Secretary, Department of Labor and Employment (DOLE), as member;
- The Secretary, Department of Interior and Local Government (DILG), as member;
- The Secretary, Department of Trade and Industry (DTI), as member;
- The Chairperson, CHED, as member;
- The Director General, TESDA, as member;
- The Chairperson, Professional Regulation Commission (PRC), as member;
- One representative of the economic sector, as member; and
- One representative of the industry sector, as member.

== See Also ==
- Qualifications framework
- Australian Qualifications Framework
- Scottish Credit and Qualifications Framework (SCQF)
