= Slavery in colonial Spanish Philippines =

Spanish slavery was introduced to the Philippines through the encomienda system which was instituted throughout the Indies by Nicolás de Ovando, governor of the Indies from 1502 to 1509.

This system rewarded the Spanish conquerors with forced labor from the native peoples. A system of serfdom, the pre-colonial alipin system, already existed before the islands were colonized by the Spanish Empire in 1565, but it differed in that groups of native people were not obliged to render forced labor to superiors. Rather, the alipin rendered services and labor under a complex system of obligations; indeed the etymology indicates that they were originally war captives rendering ransom. After a Spanish clergyman and social reformer Bartolomé de las Casas wrote about the abuses of the encomienda system and of the native peoples in his book A Short Account of the Destruction of the Indies, public outcry and his lobbying in Spain caused the enaction of the New Laws in 1542.

According to his firsthand accounts, enslaved natives in the Indies were burned alive, starved, forced to work in mines, and the women stopped producing milk because of the hard labor they were forced into.' While no similarly graphic accounts exists of the abuses endured by the native Filipinos, several revolts occurred due to encomienda even after the passage of the new laws and continued abuse of the system was recorded.

From the late 16th century to the early 17th century, Spanish soldiers, officials, and settlers often acquired slaves through the preexisting native alipin system as a way to skirt around the New Laws. Many of these slaves were taken back to Nueva España (where they were called chinos) and Spain as personal servants or slaves of the Spanish crew and passengers of the Manila Galleons. In addition, many native Filipinos were also pressed into service as sailors for the galleons, often under harsh conditions. These practices and the indigenous alipin system were eventually stopped by the mid-1600s, after additional royal decrees which mandated harsh punishments for violations of the Laws of the Indies, as well as heavy taxes levied on personal servants brought aboard galleons.

Slavery of people who were not under Spanish jurisdiction, however, was not banned. Slaves purchased from other slave markets in Southeast Asia passed through Manila and onward to Mexico in the Manila Galleons. Native captives of Spain from the Spanish–Moro conflict were also enslaved in this way. Conversely, Filipinos who were subjects of Spain were often enslaved by Moro pirates and raiders. They were either integrated as slaves into the Moro Sultanates, ransomed to relatives, or sold further on to the Dutch East Indies (via the Sultanate of Gowa) and the Chinese.
