= National qualifications framework =

Formal system for describing qualifications

A national qualifications framework (NQF) is a formal system describing qualifications. 47 countries participating in the Bologna Process are committed to producing a national qualifications framework. Other countries not part of this process also have national qualifications frameworks.

== Qualifications framework ==
A qualifications framework is a formalized structure in which learning level descriptors and qualifications are used in order to understand learning outcomes. This allows for the ability to develop, assess and improve quality education in a number of contexts. Qualifications frameworks are typically found at the national, regional, and international level. Therefore, a national qualifications framework is one type of qualifications framework.

== Australia ==
The Australian Qualifications Framework is the national qualifications framework in Australia.

== Barbados ==
National/Caribbean Vocational Qualifications (N/CVQ) are awarded by the Technical and Vocational Education and Training Council (TVET). N/CVQs are work-related and competency-based. Training for the qualifications can be earned from the Samuel Jackman Prescod Polytechnic, the Barbados Vocational Training Board, or the National Initiative for Service Excellence. Standards for the qualifications are drawn up by industry experts and qualifications are only awarded where the trainee can demonstrate the ability to meet these standards to certified assessors. There are five levels - level 1 (entry level occupations), level 2 (skilled occupations), level 3 (technical, skilled, and supervisory occupations), level 4 (technical specialist and middle management occupations), and level 5 (chartered, professional, and senior management occupations).

== Caribbean region ==
Regional accreditation bodies are planned to assess qualifications for equivalency, complementary to the free movement of persons. To this end, the member states have concluded the Agreement on Accreditation for Education in Medical and other Health Professions. By this agreement, an authority (the Caribbean Accreditation Authority for Education in Medical and Other Health Professions) is established which will be responsible for accrediting doctors and other health care personnel throughout the CSME. The authority will be headquartered in Jamaica, which is one of among six states (Antigua and Barbuda, Belize, Jamaica, Suriname, Trinidad and Tobago) in which agreement is already in force. The Bahamas has also signed on to the agreement.

Region-wide accreditation has also been planned for vocational skills. Currently local training agencies award National Vocational Qualifications (NVQ) or national Technical and Vocational Education and Training (TVET) certification, which are not valid across Member States. However, in 2003, the Caribbean Association of National Agencies (CANTA) was formed as an umbrella organization of the various local training agencies including Trinidad and Tobago's National Training Agency, the Barbados TVET Council and the Organisation of Eastern Caribbean States TVET agency and the HEART Trust/NTA of Jamaica. Since 2005, the member organizations of CANTA have been working together to ensure a uniformed level of certified skilled labour under the Caricom Single Market and Economy (CSME) and CANTA itself has established a regional certification scheme that awards the Caribbean Vocational Qualification (CVQ), which is to replace NVQs and national TVET certifications. The CVQ will be school-based and although based on the certification scheme of CANTA, will be awarded by the Caribbean Examinations Council (CXC) which will be collaborating with CANTA on the CVQ programme. At the 9–10 February 2007 meeting of the Regional Coordinating Mechanism for Technical and Vocational Education and Training, officials discussed arrangements for the award of the CVQ which was approved by the Council for Human and Social Development (COHSOD) in October 2006. It was expected that the CVQ programme may be in place by mid-2007, if all the requirements are met and that provisions were being made for the holders of current NVQs to have them converted into the regionally accepted type (although no clear mandate is yet in place). This deadline was met and in October 2007, the CVQ programme was officially launched. The CVQ now facilitates the movement of artisans and other skilled persons in the CSME. This qualification will be accessible to persons already in the workforce as well as students in secondary schools across the Caribbean region. Those already in the work force will be required to attend designated centres for assessment.

The CVQ is based on a competency-based approach to training, assessment and certification. Candidates are expected to demonstrate competence in attaining occupational standards developed by practitioners, industry experts and employers. Those standards when approved by CARICOM allow for portability across the Region. Currently, CVQs are planned to reflect a Qualification framework of five levels. These are:

- Level 1: Directly Supervised/Entry –Level Worker
- Level 2: Supervised Skilled Worker
- Level 3: Independent or Autonomous Skilled Worker
- Level 4: Specialized or Supervisory Worker
- Level 5: Managerial and/or Professional Worker

CVQs are awarded to those candidates who would have met the required standards in all of the prescribed units of study. Statements are issued in cases where candidates did not complete all the requirements for the award of CVQ. Schools that are suitably equipped currently offer Levels 1 & 2.

By March 2012 up to 2,263 CVQs had been awarded in the workforce across the region and 2,872 had been awarded in schools for a total of 5,135 CVQs awarded up to that time. The breakdown of the agency awarding the over 5,000 CVQs by March 2012 stood at 1,680 having been awarded by the CXC and 3,455 being awarded by the various National Training Agencies (with some being awarded in the workplace and some being awarded in secondary schools).

Sources

- JIS website on the CSME
- SICE - Establishment of the CSME

== South Africa ==
A graph mapping out the National Qualification Frameworks (NQF) and how they relate to different educational options within the South African educational system in 2017. NQFs are a key component of the South African higher education system since being implemented in 1995 and is administered by the South African Qualifications Authority.

== United Kingdom ==
The current national qualifications frameworks in the UK are:

- England: Regulated Qualifications Framework (RQF) for general and vocational qualifications regulated by Ofqual
- Northern Ireland: Council for the Curriculum, Examinations and Assessment (CCEA)
- Wales: Credit and Qualifications Framework for Wales (CQFW) for all qualifications.
- Scotland: Scottish Credit and Qualifications Framework (SCQF) for all qualifications.

The Frameworks for Higher Education Qualifications of UK Degree Awarding Bodies (FHEQ) for qualifications awarded by bodies across the United Kingdom with degree-awarding powers.

== India ==
India's National Skill Development Agency (NSDA)'s National Skills Qualification Framework (NSQF), is a quality assurance framework which grades and recognises levels of skill based on the learning outcomes acquired through both formal or informal means.

Indian Education System recognises the following: RPL: Recognition of Prior Learning, NCWP: National Certificate for Work Preparation, NCC: National Competency Certificate

The National Vocational Education Qualifications Framework (NVEQF)
		Case I	Case II	
Level	Certificate	Equivalence	Equivalence	Certifying body
10	NCC 8	Degree	Doctorate	University and sector skills council
9	NCC 7	PG Diploma	Master's degree	University and sector skills council
8	NCC 6	PG Diploma	Master's degree	University and sector skills council
7	NCC 5	Advanced Diploma	Bachelor's degree	Board of Technical Education and sector skills council, university and sector skills council
6	NCC 4	Advanced Diploma	Bachelor's degree	Board of Technical Education and sector skills council, university and sector skills council
5	NCC 3	Diploma	Bachelor's degree	Board of Technical Education and sector skills council, school board and sector skills council,
4	NCC 2	Diploma	Grade XII	Board of Technical Education and sector skills council, school board and sector skills council,
3	NCC 1	Diploma	Grade XI	Board of Technical Education and sector skills council, school board and sector skills council,
2	NCWP 2	Grade X	Grade X	School board and sector skills council
1	NCWP 1	Grade IX	Grade IX	School board and sector skills council
RPL	RPL 2	Grade VIII	Grade VIII	NIOS/State Open Schools and SSC
RPL	RPL 1	Grade V	Grade V	NIOS/State Open Schools and SSC

== Indonesia ==
Indonesian National Qualifications Framework (Kerangka Kualifikasi Nasional Indonesia) enacted by Presidential Regulation Number 8 Year 2012.

Indonesian National Qualification Framework
INQF Level	Academic Education	Professional Education	Vocational Education	Training and Expertise
9	Doctorate	Consultant	(Applied) Doctorate	Expert
8	Master	Specialist	(Applied) Master	Expert
7	-	(First) Professional Degree	-	Expert
6	Bachelor	-	Diploma IV/Bachelor of Applied Science	Technician Analyst
5	-	-	Diploma III	Technician Analyst
4	-	-	Diploma II	Technician Analyst
3	-	-	Diploma I	Operator
2	Upper secondary	-	Vocational secondary	Operator
1	Basic education			Operator

== Ireland ==
The National Framework of Qualifications is the framework used in Ireland.

== Kenya ==
In December 2014 the Parliament of Kenya passed the Kenya National Qualifications Framework Act to establish a "national system for the articulation, classification, registration, quality assurance, and the monitoring and evaluation of national qualifications".

== New Zealand ==
The New Zealand Qualifications Framework, administered by the New Zealand Qualifications Authority, covers qualifications in secondary and tertiary education in New Zealand.

== Pakistan ==
The National Qualifications Framework of Pakistan covers qualifications from pre-primary to doctoral degrees in eight levels, taking in academic and vocational education. Higher education, corresponding to levels five to eight, is covered by the Framework for Higher Education Qualifications of Pakistan, administered by the Higher Education Commission of Pakistan.

== Philippines ==
The Philippines uses the Philippine Qualification Framework (PQF) as its national level qualifications framework.

As a member of the Association of Southeast Asian Nations (ASEAN), the Philippines adopts the ASEAN Qualifications Reference Framework (AQRF) to link national qualifications framework across ASEAN member states.

The PQF is implemented by the Department of Education (DepEd), Technical Education and Skills Development Authority (TESDA), Commission on Higher Education (CHED), Professional Regulation Commission (PRC), Department of Labor and Employment (DOLE), Department of Interior and Local Government (DILG), and Department of Trade and Industry (DTI).

This article incorporates text from a free content work. Licensed under CC-BY-SA IGO 3.0 (license statement/permission). Text taken from Level-setting and recognition of learning outcomes: The use of level descriptors in the twenty-first century, 10, 12-13, Keevey, James; Chakroun, Borhene, UNESCO. UNESCO.
