= Work immersion =

Work immersion in the Philippines is an integral part of the country's K–12 educational system. It is a mandatory on-the-job training program for graduating senior high school students. Rooted in both educational reform and cultural values, this program reflects the Philippines' broader efforts to align education with employability and national development.

== History ==
=== Educational reform and K–12 implementation ===
The Enhanced Basic Education Act of 2013 (Republic Act No. 10533) introduced the K–12 curriculum, adding two years of senior high school (Grades 11 and 12). As part of this reform, work immersion was mandated to help students:

- Acquire practical experience in their chosen tracks (e.g., STEM, ABM, TVL)
- Develop soft and technical skills
- Strengthen career readiness

Before this reform, the Philippine education system offered only 10 years of basic education, which was seen as insufficient for global workforce competitiveness. Work immersion was included to close this gap and mirror international standards. At the collegiate level, there are also on-the-job (OJT) trainings.

=== Strengthened SHS Program ===
In the Strengthened SHS Program the Department of Education decreased the offered tracks into the Technical-Professional (TechPro) Track and the Academic Track. Under the new curriculum the maximum number of hours for work immersion is increased from 320 to 640 hours depending on the track.

== Partners ==
The Department of Education relies on partnerships in the implementation of the work immersion.

On August 8, 2024, the Department of Education signed a Memorandum of Agreement with the Private Sector Advisory Council.

=== Philippine Chamber of Commerce and Industry ===
In 2025, an agreement was signed with the Philippine Chamber of Commerce and Industry (PCCI) for work immersion.

=== Jollibee Group ===
In 2025, the Department of Education signed with Jollibee Group for the development of a Quick Service Restaurant (QSR) curriculum with a component on work immersion.

On January 15, 2026, the Senior High School (SHS) Quick Service Restaurant (QSR) Tech Pro elective was launched during the DepEd SHS QSR Curriculum and Work Immersion Workgroup Kickoff.

=== Australian Government ===
In July 2026, the Education Quality for Inclusive Prosperity (EQUIP) Program was launched by DepEd and Australian Government to support the work immersion through the partnership of Philippine schools and Australian institutions.

== See also ==
- Department of Education (Philippines)
