= JE Mondejar Foundation College =

Private college in Tacloban, Philippines

- Type: Private Elementary, High School, College, Graduate
- Established: 1990
- Founder: Jose Rene E. Mondejar
- Location: Tacloban, Philippines; 11°14′37″N 125°00′15″E
- Website: www.mondejar.edu
- Location in the Visayas Location in the Philippines

JE Mondejar Foundation College (JEMFC) is a private school in Tacloban, Philippines. It was founded in 1990 by Jose Rene E. Mondejar as the JE Mondejar Computer College as a private trade school offering courses computer technology and electronic data processing to companies and government agencies. The school has since grown into a full four-year college and graduate school, offering bachelor's degrees in Computer Science, Information Technology, and Business Administration, associate degrees in various computer hardware and software technology areas, and certificate programs in commercial food service, as well as continuing to offer short courses in current computer technology. JEMFC also offers graduate programs (master's degree level) in Business and Nursing.

In 2007, the school changed its name to JE Mondejar Foundation College, reflecting its broader scope. In 2008, the school added elementary and high school departments.
