= Qualifications framework =

A qualifications framework is a formalized structure in which learning level descriptors and qualifications are used in order to understand learning outcomes. This allows for the ability to develop, assess and improve quality education in a number of contexts. Qualifications frameworks are typically found at the national, regional, and international level.

== History ==
The origin of qualification structures can be traced back to organized education in antique civilizations such as Greece, Sparta, Rome and China. As no specialized career structure existed in these cultures, organized education focused on broad issues of international citizenship, and not on professional preparedness, which was achieved mainly through informal apprenticeships. As civilizations developed, the role of social class and caste received more emphasis, and people who displayed certain competences were grouped together. The advantage of having participated in and benefited from education gradually became more visible as civilizations developed. In this respect the Chinese civilization was the most organized, with a series of levels attached to examinations, which in turn granted the right of access to public office. During the Middle Ages education had a particularly religious nature, while the late medieval centuries were categorized by a new approach to education alongside the clergy and feudal knighthood. New economic objectives as a result of the Crusades and the development of banking, importing and shipping across Europe and the West gave rise to the development of cities, and a new form of education aimed at professional life. Education became available to the middle classes, and the merchant and craft guild system developed.

The first institutions of formal higher education were established at this time in the Islamic universities of Al-Azhar in Cairo and Sankore in Timbuktu. By the eleventh century, universities were developing in Europe, largely in reaction to the previous narrow religious doctrine. The establishment of the University of Bologna marked the beginning of the European university tradition. This was also the time when the term 'qualification' acquired a more definite meaning, although it retained its emphasis on social class structures. The nineteenth century brought with it a wave of liberalism and consciousness of equal rights and opportunities, accompanied by increased specialization and bureaucratization. The increased need for skilled employees eventually resulted in an emphasis on credentials which persists to the present day. During the twentieth century the emphasis shifted to human capital theory and technological development, eventually leading to concerns whether the education system was able to meet the demands of the labour market. At the time it was argued that the strong divisions were creating barriers to learning, and that there was a need to do away with the sharp distinction between academic and professional systems.

During the late 1980s, and strongly influenced by the thinking on integration but also by a focus on professional training through a competency approach, the notion of a National Qualification Frameworks (NQF) emerged in the United Kingdom. Its roots lay in the competence approach to professional education which was broadened by Jessup, as well as the Scottish Action Plan which led to the modularization of professional education in Scotland. The idea developed that all qualifications could be expressed in terms of outcomes without prescribing learning pathways or programmes. Within this politically charged melting pot of factors, and a renewed emphasis on the importance of lifelong learning, the first NQFs were established in Australia, England, Scotland, New Zealand, Ireland and South Africa between 1989 and 1995. France, as a country with a different tradition from the anglophone countries, was also a member of this group of first-generation NQFs (Bouder, 2003; Keevy et al., 2011). In the case of France, the NQF drew on a hierarchy of qualifications that found official expression at the end of 1960s in a nomenclature which tried to rationalize the number of students leaving the education and training system to correspond with the needs of the labour market.

Across the first-generation countries, NQFs were conceptualized as hierarchical classifications of levels of formal learning programmes and their associated qualifications and certificates. Integral features of NQFs included new quality assurance and standards-setting regimes based on learning outcomes, and importantly for this study, level descriptors which are used to determine the level at which a qualification should be pegged.

== Construction ==
All qualifications frameworks are learning outcomes-based. In qualifications frameworks, qualifications are developed using learning outcomes, and the set of hierarchical levels they consist of are described with a set of learning level descriptors.

Qualifications frameworks emerged from two complementary education and training discourses in the late 1980s: the competence approach to professional education, and the shift to learning outcomes, embedded within the broader concept of lifelong learning. As a result, the interrelationship between competences and learning outcomes was not only firmly embedded in qualifications framework thinking from the very outset, but was also used in a hybridized form.

== National level ==
A national qualifications framework (NQF) addresses the educational quality concerns of specific countries. Some examples include:

- Australian Qualifications Framework (AQF)
- Scottish Credit and Qualifications Framework (SCQF)
- German Qualifications Framework (Deutscher Qualifikationsrahmen, DQR)

== Regional level ==
A Regional Qualifications Framework (RQF) focuses specifically on qualifications at the regional level. Some examples include:

- European Qualifications Framework (EQF)
- SADC RQF
- CARICOM TVET Qualifications Framework (TVET QF)
- ASEAN RQF
- Qualifications Framework for the European Higher Education Area (QF-EHEA)
- Pacific Qualifications Register (PQR)

== International level/world reference levels ==
The purpose of the world reference levels lies mainly in their potential to provide a neutral and independent reference point against which a level of learning can be assessed.

The idea of a set of world reference levels was considered in May 2012, during the Third International Congress on professional education, held in Shanghai, China. The research included in this report was initiated by UNESCO based on the recommendation from the Congress to the UNESCO Director-General to undertake this work. The UNESCO TVET Section, in cooperation with the European Commission's Directorate General for Education and Culture and the European Centre for the Development of Professional Training (CEDEFOP), subsequently invited key organizations in Brussels to deliberate on the Shanghai Consensus Recommendation in September 2013. The deliberations included regional developments in Europe, notably the European Qualifications Framework (EQF) and in Asia, notably a common standard for competences developed by the Association of South East Asian Nations (ASEAN), as well as the move towards regional qualifications frameworks (RQFs) in Central America and the Southern African Development Community (SADC). At the national level, the development of national qualifications frameworks (NQFs) was considered across and beyond these regions, including Mercosur (Mercado Común del Sur, the Common Market of the South) in South America and the development of a transnational qualifications framework (TQF) by twenty-nine small states of the Commonwealth. The additional dimension of learning metrics as used in longitudinal studies, international competence assessments and diagnostics reviews was also considered.

The Brussels deliberations concluded that the mobility of people (both learners and workers, including migrant workers) and jobs (including outsourcing and offshoring) constitutes an important driver for the world reference levels emanating from the Shanghai Consensus Recommendation. It was noted that jobs are not always matched to demands during these movements, because of demographic shifts and the differential capacities of economies to create jobs. The cross-border provision of education and training, as well as the technological developments resulting in increased open and distance learning, and online learning, were also identified as important drivers towards world reference levels. Another important driver identified in the Brussels deliberations was the need for international dialogue, cooperation and capacity-building in the field of the recognition of qualifications.

== Other types of frameworks ==
=== Sectoral qualifications frameworks ===
Sectoral qualifications frameworks are developed within a specific country and with a specific sectoral focus. Examples include:

- a TVET framework in Jamaica
- the occupational qualifications subframework in South Africa
- the General Education Qualifications Framework in Poland
- the Engineering Sectoral Framework in Armenia

=== Transnational qualifications frameworks ===
Transnational qualifications frameworks are developed across a range of countries. Where these countries are in the same geographical proximity they are referred to as regional qualifications frameworks (examples include the SADC RQF and the EQF). Transnational qualifications frameworks can also be developed across countries that are not in the same geographic proximity.

=== For online learning ===
==== The E-xcellence framework ====
The E-xcellence framework was developed by the European Association of Distance Teaching Universities (EADTU). It is an instrument for benchmarking the quality of online, open and flexible education at programme, faculty and institutional levels. The framework defines requirements (called "benchmarks") for the entire process, from curriculum design to delivery, including the management and support of online and blended learning.

==== The OpenupEd quality label ====
The OpenupEd quality label is derived from the E-xcellence framework. Ossiannilsson and colleagues identified this framework as useful for certification and benchmarking. The label describes a self-assessment and review Quality Assurance (QA) process for the MOOCs (Massive open online courses) in the European OpenupEd partnership, but the OpenupEd framework can be used for the QA of any MOOC. The benchmarks statements in this label, derived from benchmarks produced by the E-xcellence framework, are divided into two groups: those that apply at the institutional level and those for individual courses (MOOCs).

== Learning level descriptors ==
Learning level descriptors are essential elements in Qualifications Frameworks. Learning Level descriptors are statements that provide a broad indication of learning appropriate to attainment at a particular level, describing the characteristics and context of learning expected at that level. They are designed to support the reviewing of specified learning outcomes and assessment criteria in order to develop particular modules and units and to assign credits at the appropriate level.

== Learning outcomes ==
A learning outcome is a measurable result of a learning experience which allows us to ascertain to which extent / level / standard a competence has been formed or enhanced. Learning outcomes can be used to describe many things, including knowledge, skills and competences (KSC), in the context of qualifications frameworks. Learning outcomes are increasingly being used in global context 'as a dynamic tool for modernisation and reform'. The key mechanism through which the learning outcomes approach is being implemented is qualifications frameworks, but there are also others, such as within curriculum reform on both national and international levels. The Tuning Project, which started in 2000, stands out as a good example of the introduction of learning outcomes outside of, but nonetheless related to, qualifications frameworks. Learning outcomes are used in the formulation of qualifications, and also in the formulation of level descriptors.

Definitions of the concept of learning outcomes vary across contexts, although some common elements can be identified. Here are several definitions. Learning outcomes...

- Describe what students will know and be able to do upon successful completion of a course or programme.
- The contextually demonstrated end-products of specific learning processes which include knowledge, skills and values.
- The Statements of what a learner knows, understands and is able to do after the completion of learning.
- A statement of what students should know, understand and can do upon the completion of a period of study.
- Knowledge, skill, and aspects of competence that a learner is expected to know and be able to do.

From a review of the interpretation of learning outcomes it is evident that learning outcomes are understood to be statements that describe mainly three major domains: knowledge (learning to know), skills (learning to do) and competences (learning to be).

=== Competences ===
The interrelationship between learning outcomes and competences is best illustrated in qualifications frameworks. While learning outcomes often describe competences, competences can also be stand alone. Competences represent a dynamic combination of cognitive and meta-cognitive skills, demonstration of knowledge and understanding, interpersonal, intellectual and practical skills, and ethical values.

== Sources ==
This article incorporates text from a free content work. Licensed under CC-BY-SA IGO 3.0. Text taken from Level-setting and recognition of learning outcomes: The use of level descriptors in the twenty-first century, 10, 12-13, 15-16, 21, 31-33, 35, 71-72, 80-81, UNESCO. UNESCO.

This article incorporates text from a free content work. Licensed under CC-BY-SA IGO 3.0 (license statement/permission). Text taken from Making Sense of MOOCs: A Guide for Policy-Makers in Developing Countries, 42-43, Patru, Mariana; Balaji, Venkataraman, UNESCO. UNESCO.
