= Technical Education and Skills Development Authority =

Philippine vocational and skills authority

- Pangasiwaan sa Edukasyong Teknikal at Pagpapaunlad ng Kasanayan
- Official Seal

- Logo

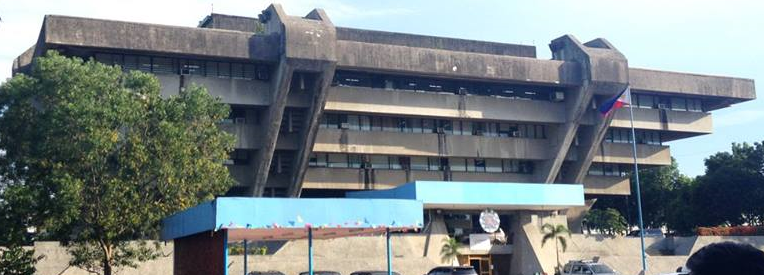
- TESDA Building in Taguig

Agency overview
- Formed: September 15, 1994; 31 years ago
- Headquarters: TESDA Building 15, East Service Road, Brgy. Western Bicutan, Taguig, Metro Manila, Philippines
- Employees: 4,128 (2024)
- Annual budget: ▼PH₱20.74 billion (2025)
- Agency executive: Jose Francisco Benitez, Director General
- Parent agency: Department of Labor and Employment (from September 16, 2022)
- Website: www.tesda.gov.ph

The Technical Education and Skills Development Authority (TESDA [ˈtɛsda]; Filipino: Pangasiwaan sa Edukasyong Teknikal at Pagpapaunlad ng Kasanayan) serves as the technical vocational education and training (TVET) authority of the Philippines. As a government agency, TESDA's goals are to develop the Filipino workforce with "world-class competence and positive work values" and to manage, supervise, and provide quality technical-educational and skills development through its direction, policies, and programs.

== History ==
=== Predecessor ===
Technical-Vocational Education was first introduced to the Philippines through the enactment of Act No. 3377, or the "Vocational Act of 1927." On June 3, 1938, the National Assembly of the Philippines passed Commonwealth Act No. 313, which provided for the establishment of regional national vocational trade schools of the Philippine School of Arts and Trades type, as well as regional national vocational agricultural high schools of the Central Luzon Agricultural High School Type, effectively providing for the establishment of technical-vocational schools around the country.

On June 22, 1963, Republic Act. No. 3742, or "An Act Creating A Bureau of Vocational Education, Defining its Functions, Duties, and Powers, and Appropriating Funds Therefor" was passed, which provided for the creation of a Bureau of Vocational Education (BVE). The creation of the BVE led to the abolishment of the Vocational Education Division of the Bureau of Public Schools. The BVE was created with the purpose of "strengthening, promoting, coordinating, and expanding the programs of vocational education now being undertaken by the Bureau of Public Schools." It was also created "for the purpose of enhancing the socio-economic program of the Philippines through the development of skilled manpower in agricultural, industrial and trade-technical, fishery and other vocational courses."

The Manpower Development Council (MDC) was created by virtue of Executive Order No. 53 on December 8, 1966, which was issued by President Ferdinand Marcos. The MDC was tasked with "developing an integrated long-term manpower plan as a component of the overall social and economic development plan." Targets which were to be established by the said manpower plan were to be "used by the Department of Education and the Budget Commission in programming public investments in education and out-of-school training schemes."

The MDC was eventually replaced by the National Manpower and Youth Council (NMYC), which was created by virtue of Republic Act. No. 5462, or the Manpower and Out-of-School Youth Development Act of the Philippines. The NMYC was placed under the Office of the President, and was charged with establishing a "National Manpower Skills Center under its authority and supervision for demonstration and research in accelerated manpower and youth training." It was also tasked with establishing "regional and local training centers for gainful occupational skills," as well as adopting "employment promotion schemes to channel unemployed youth to critical and other occupations." Republic Act No. 5462 was eventually repealed by Presidential Decree No. 422, otherwise known as the Labor Code, on May 1, 1974.

President Marcos, on September 29, 1972, issued Presidential Decree No. 6-A, or the "Educational Development Decree of 1972," which highlighted the government's educational policies and priorities at the time. The decree also provided for the "establishment and/or operation, upgrading or improvement of technical institutes, skills training centers, and other non-formal training programs and projects for the out-of-school youth and the unemployed in collaboration with the programs of the National Manpower and Youth Council."

The 1975 reorganization of the Department of Education, Culture and Sports led to the abolishment of the Bureau of Vocational Education, along with the Bureau of Public Schools and the Bureau of Private Schools. In their place, the Bureau of Elementary Education, the Bureau of Secondary Education and the Bureau of Higher Education were established. The responsibilities of the Bureau of Vocational Education were absorbed by the newly established Bureau of Secondary Education.

Eventually, the Education Act of 1982 paved the way for the creation of the Bureau of Technical and Vocational Education (BTVE). The BTVE was tasked to "conduct studies, formulate, develop and evaluate post-secondary vocational-technical programs and recommend educational standards for these programs," as well as to "develop curricular designs and prepare instructional materials, prepare and evaluate programs to upgrade the quality of teaching and non-teaching staff, and formulate guidelines to improve the physical plant and equipment of post-secondary vocational-technical schools."

=== Establishment of TESDA ===
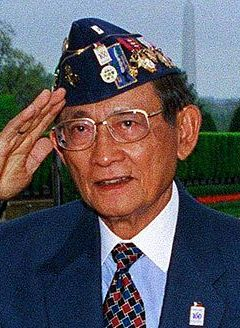
President Fidel V. Ramos signed Republic Act No. 7796, or the "Technical Education and Skills Development Act of 1994," on August 25, 1994.

The Philippine Congress enacted Joint Resolution No. 2 in 1990, effectively creating the Congressional Commission for Education or EDCOM. The commission was tasked to review and assess the education and manpower training system of the country. Among the recommendations of the commission was the establishment of the Technical Education and Skills Development Authority (TESDA), a government agency tasked with developing and overseeing the country's vocational and technical education programs and policies. The commission further recommended that the new agency be created as a fusion of the following offices: the National Manpower and Youth Council (NMYC) of the Department of Labor and Employment (DOLE), the Bureau of Technical and Vocational Education (BTVE) of the Department of Education, Culture and Sports (DECS), and the Apprenticeship Program of the Bureau of Local Employment of DOLE. Subsequently, the enactment of Republic Act No. 7796, or the "Technical Education and Skills Development Act of 1994," authored by Senators Francisco Tatad and Edgardo Angara led to the establishment of the present-day TESDA. RA 7796 was signed into law by President Fidel Ramos on August 25, 1994.

The merger of the aforementioned offices was meant to reduce bureaucratic oversight on skills development activities initiated by the private and the public sector and to provide a single agency that will take charge of the country's technical vocational and training (TVET) system. Hence, a major thrust of TESDA is the formulation of a comprehensive development plan for middle-level manpower based on the National Technical Education and Skills Development Plan. This plan provides for a reformed industry-based training program that includes apprenticeship, dual training system and other similar schemes.

=== Further reforms ===
The National Training Center for Technical Education and Staff Development (NTCTESD) and its administration were transformed from the authority of the then-Department of Education, Culture and Sports (DECS) to TESDA by virtue of Executive Order No. 337, which was issued by President Fidel V. Ramos on May 17, 1996. The transfer was done in accordance with R.A. 7796, which effectively transferred the DECS' responsibility of administering the technical-vocational education and training to TESDA. This necessitated the transfer of the administration of the NTCTESD from the DECS to TESDA.

On September 15, 2004, President Gloria Macapagal Arroyo issued Executive Order No. 358, which provided for the "institutionalization ladderized interface between Technical-Vocational Education and Training (TVET) and Higher Education (HE)." It further mandates that TESDA and the Commission on Higher Education (CHED) "develop and implement a unified national qualifications framework that establishes equivalency pathways and access ramps for easier transition and progression between TVET and higher education. The framework shall include the following mechanisms:"

- National System of Credit Transfer
- Post TVET Bridging Programs
- System of Enhanced Equivalency
- Adoption of Ladderized Curricula/Program
- Modularized Program Approach
- Competency-based Programs
- Network of Dual Sector Colleges and Universities
- Accreditation/Recognition of Prior Learning
- List of TVIs under EO 358

Executive Order No. 75, issued by President Benigno Aquino III on April 30, 2012, designated the Department of Transportation and Communications (DOTC) as the "single administration in the Philippines responsible for oversight in the implementation of the 1978 International Convention on Standards of Training, Certification, and Watchkeeping for Seafarers." Prior to the executive order, TESDA had the power to issue the Certificate of Competence for Ratings by virtue of Executive Order No. 242, s. 2000.

President Rodrigo Duterte's Executive Order No. 1, issued on June 30, 2016, effectively placed TESDA and other government agencies under the supervision of the Cabinet Secretary. The executive order mandates that the agencies mentioned "shall primarily evaluate existing poverty reduction programs and, if deemed necessary, formulate a more responsive set of programs complementing existing ones, channeling resources as necessary to reduce both the incidence and magnitude of poverty." Other duties and responsibilities have also been ascribed to the concerned agencies by this executive order.

Through an order by President Duterte, it was placed under the Department of Trade and Industry on October 31, 2018, following the reorganization of the Office of the Cabinet Secretary. In September 2022, it was reverted to the Department of Labor and Employment as an attached agency through an executive order by his successor Bongbong Marcos.

== Benefits ==
Graduating from the programs given by TESDA will ensure the trainee a National Certificate from TESDA Assessment that comes with benefits that include a quality assurance that the graduate has acquired proper knowledge and an understanding of the task at hand from undergoing a series of practical and hands-on demonstrations, positive attitudes from interviews with people who contribute to the job and work projects. Not only that, but the certificate will also guarantee that the graduate has acquired the values that can help his/her skills needed for the said occupation and for future opportunities that can follow from the success of the current project.

== Current labor force ==
The labor force participation rate (LFPR) of TVET graduates accounted for 74.5% of all graduates. Graduates of scholar programs, though, had an LFPR of 75.9% than the 71.9% LFPR of regular TVET-program graduates. In terms of delivery mode, enterprise-based program graduates had the highest LFPR (89.1%) while community-based programs had the lowest LFPR (71.7%).

The overall employment rate of TVET graduates was 60.9% in 2011. The region having the highest employment rate is CAR (82.8%), followed by Region VII (74.1%) and IV-B (71.4%). Also, TVET graduates of scholarship programs had an employment rate of 61.7% as compared to TVET graduates of regular programs (59.1%). Again, in terms of delivery mode, enterprise-based programs had the highest employment rate (83.1%) while community-based programs had the lowest (56.4%). Out of all training providers, TESDA's graduates had the highest employment rate (67.9%). 39.8% of the employed TVET graduates had an average monthly income of 5000-9999 pesos while 27.7% are earning more than 10000 pesos. 21.5% are earning less than 5000 pesos a month.

Recently, the unemployment rate among young aged 25–29 years old with tertiary education has been increasing, especially in European countries like Slovenia. This has been coupled with an increase in the enrolment rate in vocational and technical education. This has also led to the decreasing share of unemployed young people with secondary education from 58.0% in 2007 to 51.1% in 2012 along with the increasing share of unemployed young people with tertiary education from 13.1% to 19.5% in the same time period. Still, a majority of the people who have completed secondary education move on to tertiary education. It should also be noted that the percentage of unemployed young people who have completed vocational education stands at 18.1% while that of those who have completed secondary technical or general education stands at 33%. Thus, many professionals believe that there is a greater need for employees with technical or vocational education in the labor market rather than those with general tertiary education. As it stands, some even say that these people have a greater likelihood of attaining success in their careers than those with just a college degree.

== Programs and services offered ==
=== Technical-Vocational Education and Training (TVET) ===
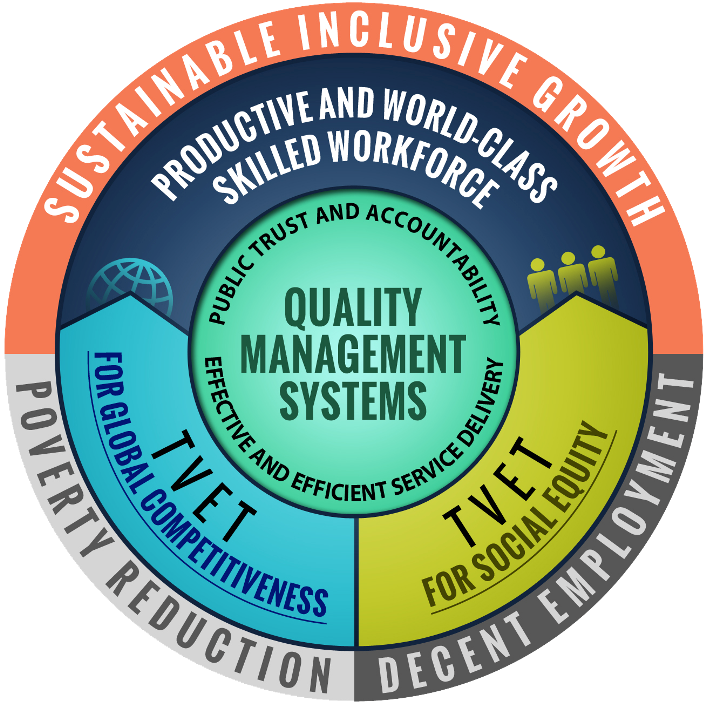
Diagram by TESDA portraying the TVET program as a "2-pronged" strategy" against poverty and unemployment.

United Nations Educational, Scientific and Cultural Organisation (UNESCO) defines Technical-Vocational Education and Training (TVET) as the education or training process which involves, in addition to general education, the study of technologies and related sciences and acquisition of practical skills relating to occupations in various sectors of economic life and social life that comprises formal (organized programs as part of the school system) and non-formal (organized classes outside the school system) approaches.

TESDA is mandated to provide Technical Vocational Education and Training (TVET) in the Philippines. TVET provides education and training opportunities for students and clients in preparation for employment. It is also offered to those part of the labor market looking to improve or develop new competencies to enhance employability in their chosen fields.

==== Training systems ====
TVET is classified into two main systems: the formal system and the non-formal system. The formal system is a post-secondary technical education of six months to three years which entitles a student or trainee to a certificate in a specialized field. Programs under the formal system are delivered by both private and public vocational-technical schools. The non-formal system, on the other hand, consists of a variety of short-term programs usually up to six months targeting a special group of clientele. This includes those seeking employment in the government, special-interest organizations, services and salesmanship, farming, and forestry and fishing.

==== Clientele ====
TVET clientele is primarily composed of high school graduates, secondary school dropouts, and college graduates and undergraduates looking to gain the necessary skills in various sectors. TVET also considers part of their targeted clientele those who are unemployed but actively looking for work, Overseas Filipino Workers (OFWs) returning to the Philippines permanently to work, and those currently employed wanting to enhance or acquire new skills.

==== Delivery modes ====
TESDA undertakes direct training provisions in order to provide TVET clients access to the various Technical Education Skills Development (TESD) programs offered. The following are the four training modalities:

- School-based: Formal delivery by the schools of TVET programs of varying duration of at least a year but not exceeding three years.
- Centre-based: Provision of short duration non-formal training undertaken in TESDA Regional and Provincial Training Centers.
- Community-based: Training programs specifically designed to answer the needs for skills training in the community to facilitate self-employment.
- Enterprise-based: Training programs like apprenticeship, learnership, and dual training which are carried out within the firms or industries.

==== Delivery networks ====
There are more than 4,500 TVET providers in the country, around 62% (2,786) of which are private and 38% (1,714) public. The Public TVET institutions include 126 Technology Institutes nationwide. Other public TVET providers include state-owned universities and colleges and local colleges offering non-degree programs; Department of Education-supervised schools; and local government units and other government agencies providing skills training programs. TVET funding would depend on the type of provider. In private TVET institutions, students or trainees pay fees. Public TVET institutions, on the other hand, are subsidized by the government so the trainees pay only a minimal or no amount for the training.

=== Training programs ===
TESDA provides direct training programs which are divided into four distinct training modalities: School-Based Programs, Center-Based Programs, Community-Based Programs, and Enterprise-Based Programs. In 2025, TESDA expanded Technical–Vocational Education and Training (TVET) with TechPro programs in basic education, free assessments for tech-voc graduates, micro-credentials, enterprise-based training, and launched Regional TVET Innovation Centers in Tuguegarao, Tacloban, and General Santos City.

==== School-based programs ====
School-based programs are TVET programs that are directly delivered or provided by TESDA-administered schools. Currently, there are 57 TESDA-administered schools, 19 of which are agriculture schools, 7 are fishery schools and 31 are trade schools. School based programs include post-secondary offerings of varying duration not exceeding three years.

==== Center-based programs ====
These are training provisions or programs that are being offered in TESDA Regional and Provincial Centers throughout the country. There are fifteen Regional Centers and forty-five provincial centers, adding up to 60 centers that provide center-based programs. Such programs are offered under selected trade areas in the different regions and provinces of the country.

The TESDA Training Center Taguig Campus Enterprise (TTCTCE) provides advanced technology training programs that are registered under the Unified TVET Program Registration and Accreditation System (UTPRAS). The TTCTCE conducts these training programs in partnership with industry organizations under a co-management scheme in response to a given industry's training requirements.

TESDA is also the implementing agency of three grant assistance projects from the Government of the Republic of Korea. The Korea-Philippines Information Technology Training Center (KPITTC), located at the Polytechnic University's Quezon City compound in Novaliches provides training on computer graphics and animation. Another grant assistance project from the Republic of Korea's government that is under the implementation of TESDA is the KPITTC located at the Regional Skills Development Center in Guiguinto, Bulacan.

==== Enterprise-based programs ====
Enterprise-based programs are training programs that are being implemented within companies or firms. There are several programs being offered by TESDA that fall under enterprise-based programs.

The Apprenticeship Program is a training and employment program that involves a contract between an apprentice and an employer in an occupation that has been approved for apprenticeship. The period of apprenticeship covers a minimum of four months and a maximum of six months. Only companies with approved and registered apprenticeship programs under TESDA can hire apprentices.

The Learnership Program, on the other hand, involves practical on-the-job training for pre-approved learnable occupations, as determined by TESDA. The program must not exceed three months. Only companies with TESDA approved and registered learnership programs can hire learners.

The Dual Training System involves an instructional mode of delivery for technology-based education and training in which learning takes place alternatively in two venues: the school or training center, and the company. One of the strategic approaches on this program is the conversion of selected industry practices/ programs registered under the apprenticeship program into DTS modality. Schools or training centers and business establishments interested in adopting the dual training system must apply for accreditation with TESDA.

==== Community-based programs ====
TESDA also provides community-based programs, which are primarily offered to those belonging to marginalized groups. These are intended to expand educational access to those who are unable to access, or are not accessible, by formal training provisions and programs. The program is also designed to assist partner agencies such as LGUs, NGOs, people organizations and other agencies and organizations with regard to their poverty-alleviation and livelihood programs.

=== Scholarship programs ===
These are programs created to give help and financial assistance to deserving TVET enrollees and trainees in the country.

==== Private Education Student Financial Assistance (PESFA) ====
The program offers educational scholarships and benefactions to college who are not only qualified but also deserving of financial assistance. In publicizing and also promoting TVET, it also guides the enrolees/ beneficiaries on what choice of career they plan on pursuing and the skills needed to be successful in these jobs which are a hot pick in the economy. Established through Section 8 of Republic Act No. 8545, the PESFA also gives assistance to institutions and establishments that gave a respectable amount of effort in the program by supplying a fair amount of enrolees to their respective courses.

==== Training for Work Scholarship (TWSP) ====
Launched in May 2006 by the Office of the President, the Training for Work Scholarship (TWSP) aims to give out solutions to those with a lack of skills in sectors that relate with one another such as metals and engineering, along with construction, tourism many more. Beginning in 2008 as a part of the regular budget, this program also looks to give out more opportunities for employees through incentives and proper training programs that link both jobs internationally and domestically. Also, its goal is to reinforce TVET institutions in making the quality of their delivery programs better in order to meet the requirements of a certain job.

==== Bottom-up Budgeting (BUB) ====
The program seeks to increase access to local service delivery taking into consideration the development needs of municipalities through a budget planning process that focuses on demands. It also aims to strengthen the government's accountability in public services. Participating agencies are expected to ensure implementation of priority through the BuB planning and budgeting processes.

==== Special Training for Employment Program (STEP) ====
The Special Training for Employment Program (STEP) plans to focus on the specific skills needed by the communities in order to promote employment. This tackles self-employment and service-oriented activities to be more specific. In this program, the objective is to provide skills and training opportunities to not only enhance the enrolees in the barangay area but to also make the enrolees more adept and keen of their skills needed to be ready for the job. Those who are a part of this program receive free training, competency assessments, tool kits and training allowance worth sixty pesos per day during the training period.

== Other functions ==
=== Job matching ===
TESDA show and trains people for employment. It seeks jobs by identifying specific job requirements through the use of international market intelligence reports. For jobs in partnership with non-government organizations, social welfare agencies and institutions, school community and organizations, TESDA finds people who it deemed suitable to be trained. TESDA then trains these people through the TVET program. TESDA developed this matching process to find the best job-skills fit, as well as increase productivity of training programs by assisting those who wish to go into micro business, small and medium enterprises of entrepreneurship.

=== TESDA core business ===
Programs and services are created and designed to provide direction for TVET in the Philippines. Some of these include the creation of plans and policies through the generation and dissemination of reliable information and research for the TVET sector.

TESDA's plans and policies include the following:

- National Technical Education Skills Development (TESD) Plan
- National Technical Education Skills Development (TESD) Research Agenda
- Philippine Technical Vocational Education and Training (TVET) System
- Philippine Technical Vocational Education and Training (TVET) Outlook
- Labor Market Intelligence Reports
- List of Technical Vocational Education and Training (TVET) Studies
- Technical Vocational Education and Training (TVET) Statistics

== Organizational structure ==
=== TESDA Board ===
The following are mandated by Republic Act No. 7796 to serve as the members of the TESDA Board:

- The Secretary of Labor and Employment as Chairperson
- The Secretary of Education, Culture and Sports (now the Secretary of Education) and the Secretary of Trade and Industry as Co-Chairpersons
- The Secretary of Agriculture, the Secretary of Interior and Local Government, and the Director-General of the TESDA Secretariat as members.

R.A. 7796 also provides additional guidelines pertaining to the TESDA Board's membership:

"In addition, the President of the Philippines shall appoint the following members from the private sector: two representatives, from the employer/industry organization, one of whom shall be a woman; three representatives, from the labor sector, one of whom shall be a woman; and two representatives of the national associations of private technical-vocational education and training institutions, one of whom shall be a woman. As soon as all the members of the private sector are appointed, they shall so organize themselves that the term of office of one-third (1/3) of their number shall expire every year. The member from the private sector appointed thereafter to fill vacancies caused by expiration of terms shall hold office for three years."

Additionally, the President of the Philippines is authorized "to revise membership of the TESDA Board, whenever the President deems it necessary for the effective performance of the Board’s functions through an administrative order."

TESDA Board as of June 2023:

- Chairman: DOLE Sec. Bienvenido E. Laguesma
- Co-Chairman:
  - DepED Sec. Juan Edgardo M. Angara
  - DTI Sec. Alfredo E. Pascual
    - Represented by: Usec. Rafaelita M. Aldaba, DTI Usec. for Competitiveness and Innovation
- Members:
  - Agriculture Secretary Francisco Tiu Laurel Jr.
    - Represented by: DA Senior Usec. Domingo F. Panganiban
  - DILG Sec. Benjamin C. Abalos Jr.
    - Represented by: Usec. Lord A. Villanueva, DILG Usec. for Operations
  - DOST Sec. Renato U. Solidum Jr.
    - Represented by: Usec. Maridon O. Sagahun, DOST Usec. for Scientific and Technical Services
  - CHED Chairman J. Prospero de Vera III, DPA
  - TESDA Director General Sec. Jose Francisco B. Benitez

Members - Private Sector:

- Labor Sector
  - Dr. Avelino S. Caraan Jr.
  - Ramon R. De Leon
  - Rogelio J. Chavez Jr.
  - Rene Luis M. Tadle
  - Shirley V. Yorong
- Employer Sector
  - Dr. Leonida Bayani-Ortiz
  - Dr. Vivien Co Say
- Business and Investment Sector
  - Mary G. Ng
  - Arturo M. Milan
- Education and Training Sector
  - Rev. Fr. Onofre Gregorio Inocencio Jr., SDB

=== TESDA Secretariat ===
The TESDA Secretariat, by virtue of R.A. 7796, is tasked "to establish and maintain a planning process and formulate a national technical education and skills development plan in which the member-agencies and other concerned entities of the Authority at various levels participate;" among other duties and responsibilities. It is headed by a Director-General, who serves as the chief executive officer of the TESDA Secretariat. In this capacity, the Director-General exercises general supervision and control over TESDA's technical and administrative personnel. The current Director-General of TESDA is Secretary Jose Francisco "Kiko" Benitez.

According to R.A. 7796, the Director-General is assisted in his or her duties by two Deputy Directors-General who are appointed by the President of the Philippines upon the recommendation of the TESDA Board. One of the Deputy Directors-General is responsible for Vocational and Technical Education and Training, and one is responsible for Policies and Planning. Currently, however, TESDA has five Deputy Directors-General:

- Rosanna A. Urdaneta, Deputy Director General for Policies and Planning
- Josefino I. Torres, Deputy Director General for Administration and Finance
- Aniceto John D. Bertiz III, Deputy Director General for TESD Operations
- Vidal D. Villanueva III, Deputy Director General for Special Concerns

Aside from the Deputy Directors-General, the Director-General is also assisted by a Chief of Services for Administration who is appointed by the TESDA Board.

Aside from the aforementioned offices, there are also other offices under the TESDA Secretariat. Each office is headed by an Executive Director, who is appointed by the Director-General.

- Planning Office
- Partnerships and Linkages Office
- National Institute for Technical Education and Skills Development
- Qualifications and Standards Office
- Certification Office
- Administrative Service
- Financial and Management Service

There are also Regional Offices, which are under the direct authority of the Director-General. These regional offices are headed by Regional Directors who are directly appointed by the President of the Philippines. The Regional Offices are further divided into the Provincial TESDA Offices, which are headed by Skill Development Officers.

== See also ==
- Vocational education in the Philippines
