= Deglobalization =

Process of diminishing global interdependence

Deglobalization or deglobalisation is the process of diminishing interdependence and integration between certain units around the world, typically nation-states. It is widely used to describe the periods of history when economic trade and investment between countries decline. It stands in contrast to globalization, in which units become increasingly integrated over time, and generally spans the time between periods of globalization. While globalization and deglobalization are antitheses, they are not mirror images.

The term of deglobalization has derived from some of the very profound change in many developed nations, where trade as a proportion of total economic activity until the 1970s was below previous peak levels in the early 1910s. This decline reflects that their economies become less integrated with the rest of the world economies in spite of the deepening scope of economic globalization. At the global level only two longer periods of deglobalization occurred, namely in the 1930s during the Great Depression and 2010s, when following the Great Trade Collapse the period of the World Trade Slowdown set in.

The occurrence of deglobalization has strong proponents who have claimed the death of globalization, but is also contested by the former Director-General of the World Trade Organization Pascal Lamy and leading academics such as Michael Bordo who argue that it is too soon to give a good diagnosis and Mervyn Martin who argues that US and UK policies are rational answers to essential temporary problems of even strong nations.

While as with globalization, deglobalization can refer to economic, trade, social, technological, cultural and political dimensions, much of the work that has been conducted in the study of deglobalization refers to the field of international economics.

== Historical development of deglobalization ==
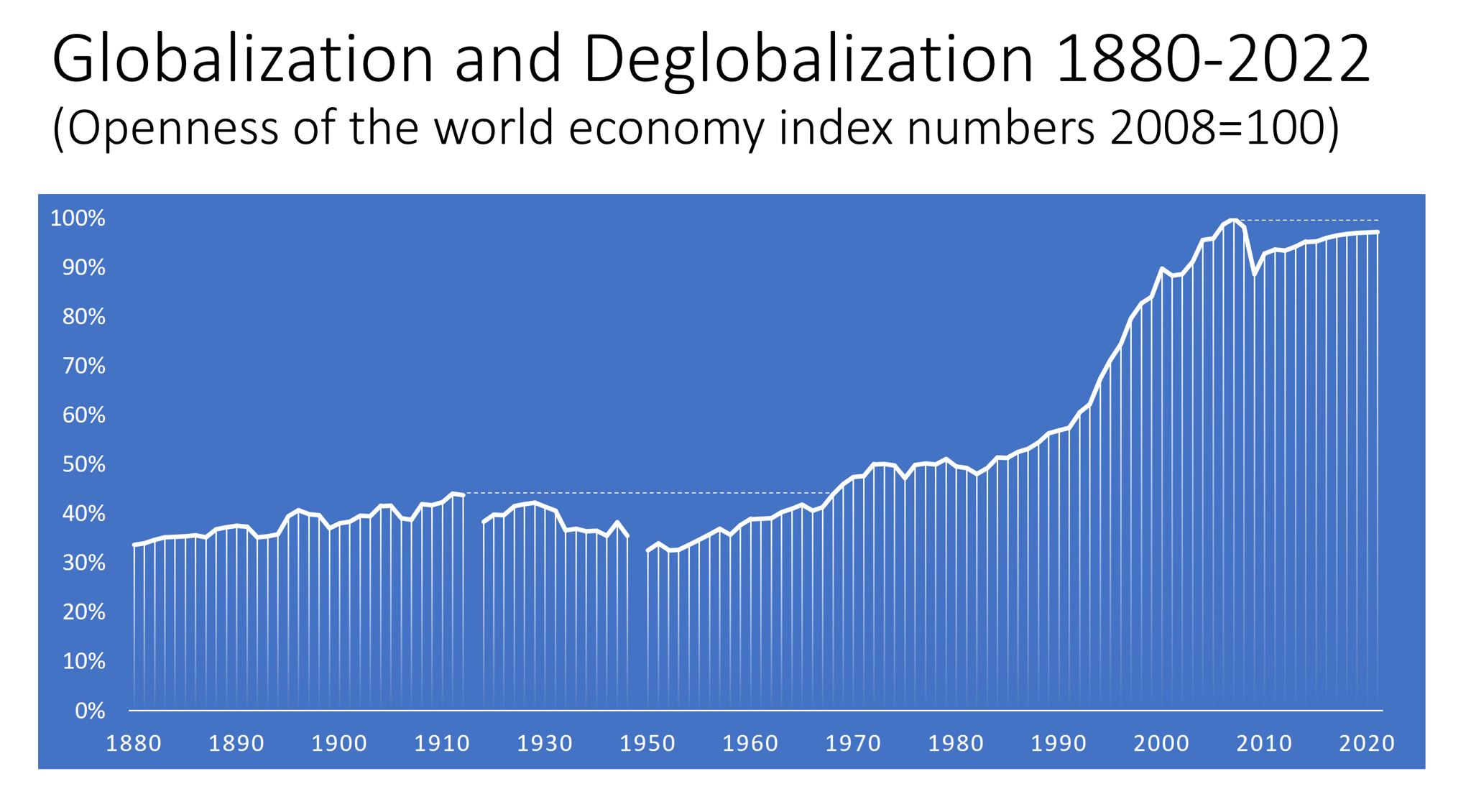
The graph shows two periods of deglobalization (1930s and 2010s) and the overall trend since 1880.

Deglobalization is often a response to a financial crisis, an armed conflict or an upsurge in economic patriotism and economic nationalism. However past evidence shows that globalization and deglobalization often follow regular cycles. There have been two main waves of deglobalization in the trade history:

=== 1914–1945: first wave of deglobalization ===
In the late 19th and early 20th centuries, countries were affected by a sharp globalization consequently of the Industrial Revolution, advancements in transportation, and financial integration. However the economic growth and the stability of global trade were damaged by the First World War (1914–1918). After World War I, nations struggled to rebuild their economies and the Great Depression (1929–1939) worsen the global economic recession, leading to high unemployment and political instability. Many countries implemented thereafter protectionist trade policies. Among the policies the Smoot-Hawley Tariff Act (1930) in the US, led to high tariffs on imports, and the Imperial Preference System in the UK, promoted trade within the British Empire. As a result, countries began to prioritize their national production and economy instead of international markets, leading to a period of deglobalization. World War II (1939–1945) disintegrated furthermore the global economy as international trade and financial markets became a secondary priority compared to the countries survival. Although both World Wars had clear deglobalizing effects in the short term, recent research has shown that these major conflicts also paved the way to new and deeper global connections afterwards.

=== 2008–Present: contemporary wave of deglobalization ===
The 2008 financial crisis marked a second wave of deglobalization. In particular, during the crisis global trade and investments slowed down because of the risk faced by banks and enterprises. In addition governments began to prioritize domestic markets and industries instead of international trade while the trust in multilateral institutions, like the IMF and the WTO, fall due to financial instability.

During the 2010s, multiple events affected the global trade, causing a deglobalization process. The main events include:

- Brexit (2016): The United Kingdom voted to leave the European Union, signalling a rejection of economic integration.
- U.S.-China Trade War (2018–2020): The U.S. imposed tariffs on Chinese goods, leading to resentful measures and increasing trade restrictions.
- The COVID-19 pandemic (2020–2022) further accelerated deglobalization by exposing vulnerabilities in global supply chains.

The two major phases of deglobalization are not identical twins. The two phases of deglobalization were equally triggered by a demand shock during a financial crisis. Both in the 1930s and in the 2000s the composition of trade was a second key determinant: manufacturing trade bore the brunt of the contraction. One important finding is that country experiences both during the Great Depression and Great Recession are very heterogeneous so that one-size-fits-all policies to counter negative impacts of deglobalization are inappropriate. In the 1930s, democracies supported free trade, and deglobalization was driven by autocratic decisions to strengthen self-sufficiency. In the 2010s, political institutions are just as significant, but now democratic decisions such as the election of U.S. President Donald Trump with an America First agenda and Brexit drive the deglobalization process worldwide. Indeed, while the industrialised countries in the 2010s avoided the pitfalls of protectionism and deflation, they have experienced different political dynamics.

== COVID-19 and deglobalization ==
In early 2020, COVID-19 caused unprecedented challenges to the global trade, leading to a decline of international flows of goods and services and supply chains. Simultaneously countries began to reevaluate their dependence on foreign trade and promoting their own economies, accelerating the trend of deglobalization of global trade.

=== Causes of deglobalization during COVID-19 ===
- The disruption of global supply chains

COVID-19 differed from other epidemics as it originated in a specific location and could spread widely, seriously affecting the world economy and international trade. As many countries have strong trade links with China, both for raw materials and manufactured goods, it generated a paralysis of the supply chain. The disruption of supply chains on a global scale led to a restructuring of trade networks. In particular China expanded its production, diversified its supply sources, and prioritized domestic consumption. Meanwhile, the United States strengthened its own industries, decreased reliance on Chinese imports, and reevaluated its trade policies and agreements. Overall, nations are shifted their focus toward local production to overcome the economic difficulties caused by the pandemic. However these measurements damaged the global trade and especially the economy of key manufacturing countries. Among the countries that were affected the most in their production, China and Vietnam were impacted first, but falls in production were less severe compared to countries such as Bangladesh, Mexico and Turkey. While in Vietnam the largest drop in production was of 18.3%, in Bangladesh it was of 77.6%, in Mexico it was of 75.8% and of 59% in Turkey.

- Protectionism

During the global public health crisis governments started to resort to trade protection policies, such as increasing tariffs, to protect their industries and job markets. Countries began to protect their own economies and regulate the competition between domestic industries and foreign enterprises. As a result, countries have become less dependent on each other. The US and China, for example, heightened tariffs on each other and tightened trade regulations, leading to a de-globalization trend in global trade. Protectionism can in the short term protect national industries and respond to economic crises. However, over time, it damages the overall well-being and economic efficiency, especially for businesses.

- Industrial advancing

The instability of the global economy caused by the pandemic led to the reorganization of global trade chains so countries could rely more on their internal supply chains. To guarantee a competitive advantage countries began to invest in new technologies and on the efficiency of their national industries. During the COVID-19 pandemic, China's manufacturing industry experienced significant growth, particularly in medical devices and life sciences. Meanwhile, the United States tightened foreign restrictions in industries to enhance its competitiveness. These measures increased national self-sufficiency as well as restrictions in science and technology between countries that compromised scientific progress and human development.

== Second Cold War and deglobalization ==
The intensifying geopolitical, economic and technological rivalry between the United States, China, Russia and their respective allies and a seemingly geopolitical shift towards a multipolar world further accelerated deglobalization, as governments shifted their own economies away from hyper-integrated supply chains toward regionalization, economic nationalism and self-sufficiency.

== Measures of deglobalization ==
Economic deglobalization can be measured utilising various indicators.These centre around the four main economic flows:

=== Flows of goods and services ===
Analysing the flow of goods and services across countries is one of the most direct ways to measure deglobalization. Economists commonly measure this comparing exports and imports to the national income (GDP) or per capita basis. This ratio reflects how much a country depends on global trade. A significant decline in trade volumes or a decreasing ratio of exports and imports can indicate a shift toward deglobalization, as countries reduce their reliance on international markets

=== Labor and migration flows ===
The movement of people, including both immigration and emigration, is another key indicator. Net migration rates and inward or outward migration flows effects the global labour markets. Increase restrictions or changes in immigration policy can reduce the rate of migration, leading to a sign of deglobalization. A reduction in cross-border migration may signal a retreat from the global economy.

=== Foreign direct investments ===
Foreign direct investment (FDI) is an important metric to analyse global capital movement. A reduction in inward or outward investment compared to the national income translates in a decrease of global economic integration. When countries set restrictions on foreign investments they move toward a period of deglobalization, as they shift toward isolationist economic policies.

=== Technology Flow ===
Technology is considered one of the four main flows that define globalization, however it is difficult to measure deglobalization through the lack of technological flows.Technology often spreads across borders, especially through multinational corporations or digital platforms. While technology flows are connected to globalization, measuring their deglobalization is difficult. Nevertheless, trends such as protectionist tech policies and the rapid expansion of the digital economy suggest a complex setting where technological sovereignty and global integration are both present.

In addition to the main economic flows, other indicators can measure the growth of deglobalization. These include:

- Average tariffs

The imposition of tariffs is one of the most direct ways to control deglobalization. In fact when countries increase tariffs on imports, it raises the cost of imported goods and reduces international trade. The rise in trade barriers is often a sign of protectionist policies that are typical in periods of deglobalization.

- Border restrictions on labour Policies restricting migration contribute to deglobalization. This is often due to economic insecurity, job competition, or political pressures. When countries reinforce border controls and labour laws the human mobility is reduced and thereafter the economy moves towards deglobalization.
- Capital controls

The imposition of capital controls, as well as limiting foreign direct investments (FDI) or outward direct investment, is considered a signal of deglobalization. Financial crises is often the main reason of capital controls as countries try to stabilize their economy by limiting the influence of foreign countries on it.

== Risks of deglobalization ==
Deglobalization has multifaceted risks, regarding both supply chains but also global development and safety between countries. Addressing these challenges requires coordinated global efforts to maintain economic integration and cooperation. Among the risks of deglobalization the most relevant concern:

=== Economic growth ===
The decrease of international trade can have a negative effect on a country's long-term economic growth. This reduction in trade can particularly impact small, open economies that rely on international trade for their profits. In particular the European Central Bank states that reshoring, or rather relocating production back to a company's original country, can reduce international trade and cross-border investment, restricting the exchange of productivity gains between countries.

=== Supply chain disruptions ===
Deglobalization can lead to increased production costs and supply chain inefficiencies. RBC Wealth Management highlights that persistent protectionism, such as trade barriers and tariffs, can cause higher outcomes for companies, greater disruptions in supply chains and difficulties in obtaining certain goods. Similarly, Geopolitical Futures states that limiting access to international labour markets can increase production costs, resulting in goods with higher prices and reduced availability of certain products or services.

=== Innovation and technological advancement ===
Innovation and technology can be effected by the restriction of global trade as well, leading to a slow economic growth. Open markets facilitate collaboration, investment in research and development, and the rapid spread of new technologies and human talent pool across borders. When countries enter a period of deglobalization, they risk isolating their innovation, making it harder to contribute to global developments in fields like artificial intelligence.

=== Geopolitical tensions ===
Reduced international cooperation can increase tensions between countries and thereafter risks of conflicts. As trade interdependence decreases, the likelihood of a country experiencing at least one war by 2035 increases, going from 0.6% in a globalized context to 3.7% in a deglobalized world. However, while considering global threats such as pandemics, Chatham House observes that they cannot be contained by borders, and different responses form countries can make the effects worse. Additionally, the World Trade Organization analyse how increased protectionism and trade tensions between major economies like the US and China, is a threat to the global financial stability and its economic growth.

== International political economy of deglobalization ==
Deglobalization has also been used as a political agenda item or a term in framing the debate on a new World economic order, for example by Walden Bello in his 2005 book Deglobalization. One of the prominent examples of deglobalization movement could be found in the United States of America, where the Bush and Obama administration instituted Buy American Act clause as party of massive stimulus package, which was designed to favor American-made goods over traded goods. Likewise, the EU has imposed new subsidies to protect their agricultural sectors for their own protection. These movements of deglobalization can be seen as the example of how developed nations react to the 2008 financial crisis through deglobalization movements. Recently a change in the pattern of anti-globalism has been observed: anti-globalism now has a strong foothold in the Global North and among right-wing (conservative) politicians, with much different attitudes in the Global South, particular among the BRICS countries.

== See also ==
- Anti-globalization movement
- I'm Backing Britain
- Trade-to-GDP ratio
