= Continentalism =

Support for cooperation or integration between nations within a continent

Continentalism refers to the agreements or policies that favor the regionalization and/or cooperation between states within a continent. The term is used more often in the European and North American contexts, but the concept has been applied to other continents including Africa, Asia and South America. In North American history, continentalism became linked to manifest destiny and involved merging continental expansion with international growth.

== Continentalism in North America ==
=== United States ===
Historically, the United States of America saw itself as a blossoming continental nation-state. Accordingly, the first governing body for the North American colonists was called the Continental Congress, which sought to receive delegates from across the British colonized areas of the continent, including the future Canadian provinces of Quebec and Nova Scotia.

Continentalism in the United States was developed through the expeditions and experiences of frontier expansion on the American frontier. In the nineteenth century, the ideology of continentalism became internationalised by the growing concept of Manifest destiny, to create a belief amongst state and commercial leaders that the United States would help spread Western civilisation from Europe to the rest of the world. Between 1840–1898, American continentalism began to involve ideas on overseas expansion, which would go on to influence the imperialistic foreign policies of Roosevelt and McKinley.

Early United States continentalism involved the gradual absorption of North American territory into the U.S. There were various struggles of independence and expansionism in the United States between 1776–1865, including American settlers battling indigenous nations and efforts to buy territory from European imperial powers such as in the Louisiana purchase. American continentalism became an issue with global implications from the mid-nineteenth century as the United States grew as an economic and political power. Continental disputes with Canada were based on America vying for greater global economic power to challenge the British dominated marketplace, as they sought commercial control of Canadian natural resources and agriculture. One benefit of the 1867 Alaska Purchase noted by Secretary of State William H. Seward was that it would make trade with the East easier, as he viewed that making America politically central would allow them to intercept European and Eastern trade effectively. This idea of using the geographic advantages of the North American continent to intercept trade was mimicked by non-state actors, such as Perry Collins in 1865 who attempted to create a telegraph line stretching from British Columbia to Alaska and Siberia.

Continentalism was replaced by a more colonialist approach to American foreign policy in the 1901 Insular Cases. The Supreme Court rulings decreed that citizens from the newly acquired territory of the Spanish–American War did not have the constitution applied to them; however, they were controlled by the U.S. judiciary. Within the United States, this led to a growth in nationalism due to the ideological separation between the nation and new territory it was colonising. Most of the inhabitants of the United States, if not all, call themselves "Americans" as a demonym, and say America to refer to the country instead of the continents of North and South America. For a more extensive discussion over this polemical case, read the main article: Use of the word American.

=== Canada ===
In Canadian political history, continentalism has referred to policies that emphasize Canadian trade and economic ties within the North American continent, particularly with the United States, over those with the United Kingdom or within the British Empire. In the 19th century, continentalism was one of the three main theories of Canadian nationality, the others being pro-British imperialism, and Canadian independence.

The most extreme form of continentalism is annexationism, which advocates all or part of Canada joining the United States. Opponents of continentalism often argue that stronger ties with the United States could eventually lead to annexation, and that this is to be feared. Continentalists themselves may or may not be in favour of continuing to deepen ties with the United States beyond the economic and into areas like a customs union, common currency or political union.

The traditional proponent of continentalism was the Liberal Party of Canada, and particularly farmers and resource industries that advocated reciprocity (i.e., free trade) with the United States. The 1911 federal election was fought over the issue of a reciprocity agreement that the Liberal government of Wilfrid Laurier had negotiated with the United States, with the Conservatives of Robert Borden opposing reciprocity. The Conservatives won the election and cancelled the agreement.

However, the Progressive Conservative Party took on many continentalist policies beginning during the Brian Mulroney government in the 1980s, which promoted and successfully signed the Canada-US Free Trade Agreement and, later, the North American Free Trade Agreement. These policies were maintained by the Liberal and Conservative governments that followed.

Continentalism today is seen in both negative and positive terms. Canadian economic nationalists typically oppose continentalism. Opposing this, many pro-market libertarians and neo-conservatives tend to favour it, on the grounds that it opens up commercial and economic opportunities, allowing free trade between nations. As this process is taking place in parallel with and as part of a broader economic globalization, the increasing trade between Canada and the United States is not generally seen as a threat to Canadian sovereignty.

=== Central America ===
A map of the original Federal Republic of Central America.

Central American reunification, sometimes called Central Americanism, is the proposed political union of the countries of Central America (historically, Costa Rica, El Salvador, Guatemala, Honduras, and Nicaragua), which had been united as one country during the existence of the Federal Republic of Central America. It is distinct from the Central American integration process, which is a diplomatic initiative similar to that of the European Union.

== Continentalism in Africa ==
Continentalism in Africa, commonly referred to as Pan-Africanism, is a sociopolitical world view, philosophy, and movement that seeks to unify native Africans and members of the African diaspora into a "global African community".

Modern Pan-Africanism began around the beginning of the twentieth century. The African Association, later renamed the Pan-African Association, was organized by Henry Sylvester Williams around 1887, and the first Pan-African Conference was held in 1900.

== Continentalism in South America ==
Continentalism in South America is linked to and associated with Bolivarianism; a set of political doctrines that enjoys currency in parts of South America, especially Venezuela. Bolivarianism is named after Simón Bolívar, the 19th century Venezuelan general and liberator who led the struggle for independence throughout much of South America.

Modern support for Bolivarianism is especially evident in Venezuela and partly responsible for the founding of the Union of South American Nations. USAN is an intergovernmental union that integrated two existing customs unions: Mercosur and the Andean Community of Nations, as part of a continuing process of South American integration and is modeled on the European Union. However, in 2019, rising concerns surrounding Nicolas Maduro's authoritarian rule in Venezuela split the Union, with the majority of South American states withdrawing from the USAN and joining the newly created Forum for the Progress and Integration of South America.

== See also ==
- Continental union
- Eurasianism
  - Pan-Asianism
  - Pan-European identity
- Foreign Investment Review Agency
- North American integration
- Pan-Africanism
- Pan-Americanism
- Regionalism (international relations)
