= Timeline of international trade =

This is a timeline of the history of international trade which chronicles notable events that have affected the trade between various countries. In the era before the rise of the nation state, the term 'international' trade cannot be literally applied, but simply means trade over long distances; the sort of movement in goods which would represent international trade in the modern world.

== Chronology of events ==
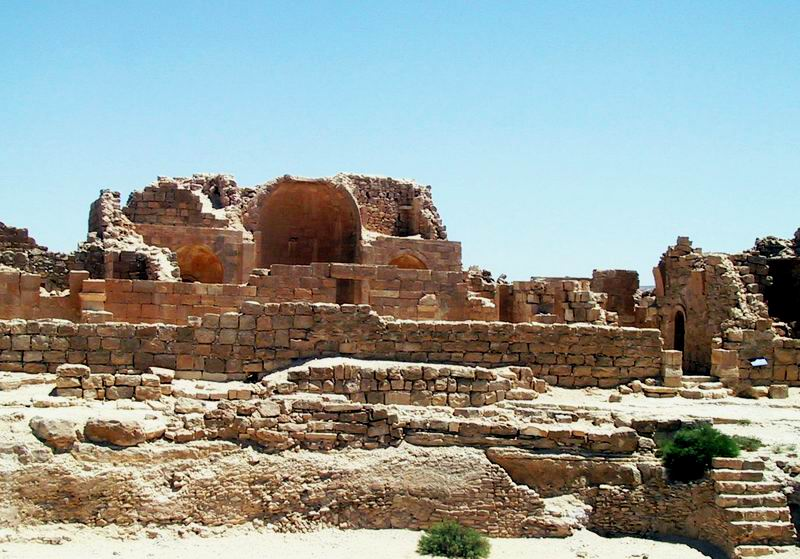
The desert Cities in the Negev were linked to the Mediterranean end of the ancient Incense Route.

=== Ancient ===
- The domestication of the horse around 4800 BCE allowed for the development of horse riding around 3700 BCE, and long distance travel across the Central Asian steppes.
- Indus–Mesopotamia trade
- Records from the 19th century BCE attest to the existence of an Assyrian merchant colony at Kanesh in Cappadocia.
- The domestication of dromedary camels around 2,000 BCE allowed Arabian nomads to control long distance trade in spices and silk from the Far East.
- The Egyptians traded in the Red Sea, importing spices from the "Land of Punt" and from Arabia.
- The Olmec (c 1200-400 BCE) developed a culture with a polytheistic pantheon, monumental architecture, and artisanal goods which was spread across Mesoamerica partly by long distance trade for obsidian, jade, and luxury feathers.
- The Chavín (c 900-250 BCE) of the northern coast of Peru and Tiwanaku (c 550-1000 CE) in the Andes were able to build large cities and temples out of stone after growing wealthy from trade networks using llama trains. Trade across the Andes was able to transport maize, llama wool, and coca from the regions they were produced.
- Indian goods were brought in Arabian vessels to Aden. Cargo was shipped as part of the Indian and Egyptian trade.
- The "ships of Tarshish", a Syrian fleet equipped at Ezion-Geber, made several trading voyages to the East bringing back gold, silver, ivory and precious stones.

=== Classical ===
- Tiglath-Pileser III attacked Gaza in order to control trade along the Incense Route.
- The Achaemenid Persian Empire (559-330 BCE) incorporated Central Asia into Near Eastern and Indian Ocean trade networks.
- The Greek Ptolemaic dynasty exploited trading opportunities with India prior to the Roman involvement.

Roman trade with India according to the Periplus Maris Erythraei, 1st century CE

- The Silk Road was established after the diplomatic travels of the Han dynasty Chinese envoy Zhang Qian to Central Asia in the 2nd Century BCE, with Chinese goods making their way to India, Persia, and the Roman Empire, and vice versa.
- With the establishment of Roman Egypt, the Romans initiated trade with India.
- The goods from the East African trade were landed at one of the three main Roman ports, Arsing, Berenice, and Moos Hormones, which rose to prominence during the 1st century BCE.
- Hanger controlled the Incense trade routes across Arabia to the Mediterranean and exercised control over the trading of aromatics to Babylon in the 1st century BCE. Additionally, it served as a port of entry for goods shipped from India to the East.
- Due to its prominent position in the incense trade, Yemen attracted settlers from the Fertile Crescent.
- Pre-Islamic Mecca used the old Incense Route to benefit from the heavy Roman demand for luxury goods.
- In Java and Borneo, the introduction of Indian culture created a demand for aromatics. These trading outposts later served the Chinese and Arab markets.
- Following the demise of the incense trade, Yemen took to the export of coffee via the Red Sea port of la-Mocha.
- The Maya had a class of wealthy merchants who traded long distances and between city states, although despite their wealth they were separated from the ruling nobility. Markets convened on specific days of the Maya calendar, and at times traders used cocoa beans as currency.
- The Ghana Empire (c 300 - 1100 CE) grew rich from the Trans-Saharan trade of gold for salt with Arab and Berber caravans from North Africa.

=== Medieval ===
- The Sogdian city of Samarkand exported unique foods, the Bactrian city of Balkh spread Buddhism to traders, and the Khwarazmian city of Khwarazm traded for furs from Siberia, while serving as key links in the Silk Road.
- Guangzhou was China's greatest international seaport during the Tang dynasty (618–907), but its importance was eclipsed by the international seaport of Lanzhou during the Song dynasty (960–1279).
- At the eastern terminus of the Silk Road, the Tang dynasty Chinese capital at Chang'an became a major metropolitan center for foreign trade, travel, and residence. This role would be assumed by Kaifeng and Hangzhou during the Song dynasty.
- The Baqt was a treaty signed around 652 to regulate trade and travel between the Christian kingdoms of Nubia and Muslim-ruled Egypt, protecting traders from both regions but requiring tribute to be paid by the Nubians to uphold the treaty.
- The city of Sijilmasa, ruled by the Islamic dynasties of Morocco, and the oasis city of Auodaghost to the south, ruled by nomadic Berber confederacies, served as staging points for the long desert crossings of the Trans-Saharan trade. Copper, cowries, and salt were sent south by camel, while ivory, gold, and slaves were sent north.
- The Sahelian kingdoms stood between the Trans-Saharan trade with the Maghreb and gold fields to the south. The oasis city of Oualata served as a trading post and customs station for Trans-Saharan caravans, though some North African traders went on to the larger cities of Timbuktu and Gao along the Niger River.

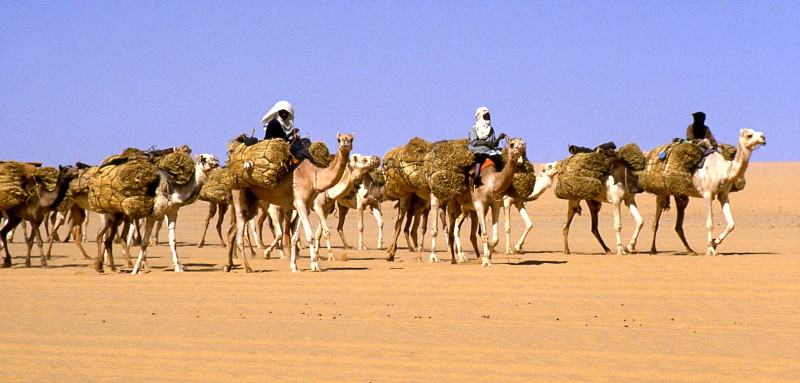
A modern camel caravan travels across the Sahara.

- Merchants arriving from India in the port city of Aden paid tribute in the form of musk, camphor, ambergris and sandalwood to Ibn Riyadh, the sultan of Yemen.
- After the first wave of the Islamic conquests in Persia and Central Asia in the 8th century, the Umayyad Arabs, Tibetans, Tang Chinese, and Western Türks competed for control of the Silk Road in Central Asia.
- The Abbasids used Alexandria, Tammie, Aden and Sirrah as entry ports to India and China.
- Swahili city states like Kilwa, Mombasa, and Mogadishu took part in the Indian Ocean trade, acting as middlemen for trade with the East African interior as well as exporting cowries, ambergris, and animal skins.
- Islamic caliphates began trading for slave soldiers or mamluks in the 9th century, including Turks and Slavs, in the hopes that these enslaved foreigners would have no choice but to remain loyal. As they rose to command armies, many mamluk slaves gained power and prestige.
- Indian exports of spices found mention in the works of Ibo Khurdadhbeh (850), AL-Afghani (1150) and Lakisha bin Trimaran (907).
- The Trans-Saharan trade introduced kingdoms in the West African Sahel to Islam.
- The Hanseatic League secured trading privileges and market rights in England for goods from the League's trading cities in 1157.
- The kingdoms of the Zimbabwe plateau traded gold for manufactured products, like glass beads, iron goods, and jewelry, from the Middle East and China through middlemen on the Swahili coast.
- The kingdom of Benin served as a regional center of trade in West Africa as well as with the Portuguese after their arrival, exporting finely made cloth produced by their women as well as trading metal goods, ivory, and slaves.
- The Mongol conquests in the 13th - 14th centuries created the largest contiguous empire in history, which also facilitated commerce and cultural exchange over vast distances.
- Marco Polo traded internationally in China
- Mansa Musa, sultan of the Mali Empire, made a Hajj or pilgrimage in 1324 across the Saharan desert to Mecca, the holy city of Islam, to demonstrate his piety and project his wealth to potential trading partners in North Africa. He brought with him a large retinue, gifts, and so much gold that his spending caused economic inflation in Cairo.
- Ibn Battuta explored the far corners of the Islamic world from 1325–1354, including traveling with trade caravans to West Africa and following trade winds across the Indian Ocean to China.
- Zheng He made several voyages across the Indian Ocean and South China Sea from 1405–1433, going as far as the Swahili coast seeking the source of luxury goods which had previously reached Ming China through intermediaries.
- Pochteca were the merchants of the Aztec Empire (1426–1521) who carried trade goods, tribute, and information about neighbors from beyond the empire's borders. Artisanal products produced in the city of Tenochtitlan served as valuable trade goods, while the city of Tlateloco was home to a large market serving thousands of people a day.
- The early Portuguese slave trade with Africa traded iron goods, textiles, and horses for hundreds of West African laborers a year destined for the Azores and Iberia. Unlike in the African slave trade they came from, captives were taken far from their homelands and had less legal rights.

=== Early modern ===
- Due to the Turkish hold on the Levant during the second half of the 15th century, the traditional Spice Route shifted from the Persian Gulf to the Red Sea.
- India's Bengal Sultanate, later absorbed into Mughal Bengal, a major trading nation in the world, was responsible for 12% of Global industrial output between the 15th and 17th centuries, signaling Proto-industrialization.
- The kingdom of Kongo was introduced to Christianity by trade with the Portuguese, leading to the conversion of the soon-to-be king Afonso I in 1491. However, despite early friendly relations with the Portuguese, the constant warfare and loss of population from the slave trade to Portuguese Brazil led the kingdom to decline.
- In 1492 a Spanish expedition commanded by Christopher Columbus arrived in America.
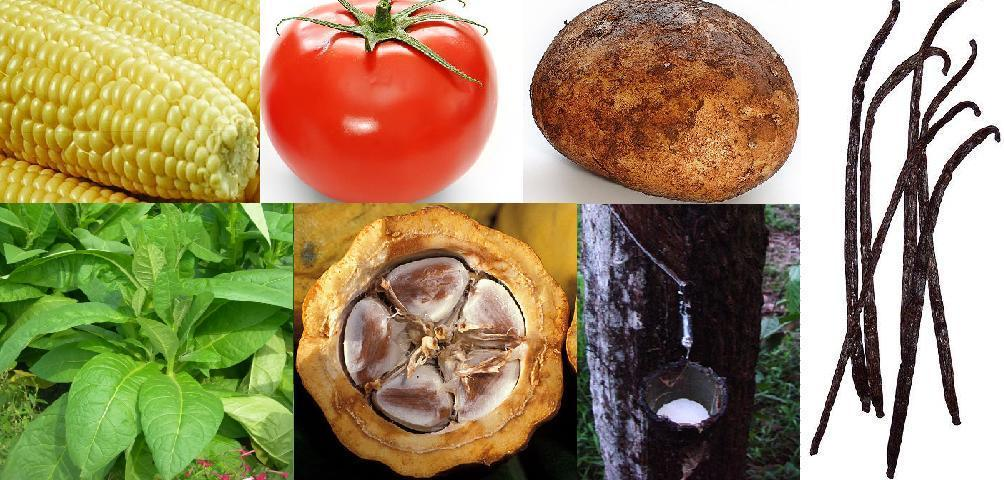
  The Columbian Exchange introduced New World plants, animals, and diseases to the Old World. Clockwise, from top left: Maize, Tomato, Potato, Vanilla, Pará rubber tree, Cacao, and Tobacco.
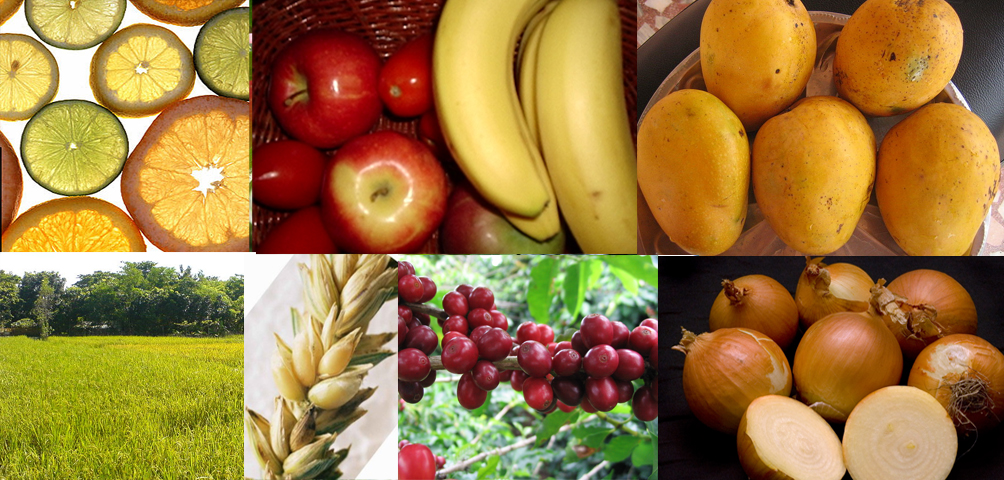
  The Columbian Exchange introduced Old World plants, animals, and diseases to the New World. Clockwise, from top left: Citrus, Apple, Banana, Mango, Onion, Coffee, Wheat, and Rice.
- Portuguese diplomat Pêro da Covilhã (1460 – after 1526) undertook a mission to explore the trade routes of the Near East and the adjoining regions of Asia and Africa. The exploration commenced from Santana (1487) to Barcelona, Naples, Alexandria, Cairo and ultimately to India.
- Portuguese explorer and adventurer Vasco da Gama is credited with establishing another sea route from Europe to India by sailing around Africa from 1497-99.
- The indigenous peoples of the Americas are devastated by infectious diseases from Europe; in response, European colonial powers begin to transport enslaved Africans via the transatlantic slave trade to provide laborers for plantations and mines. This trade, in turn, was destructive to the societies of West Africa where slaves were captured and sold.
- The transatlantic slave trade transported unprecedented numbers of captive slaves, numbering roughly 12 million people, from Africa to European colonies in the Americas. Conditions in the slave ships were extremely inhumane and many slaves died in their attempted capture and in transit. Slaves were able to start families and established new populations in the Americas, although families could be broken up when family members were sold away.
- In the 1530s, the Portuguese shipped spices to Hormuz.
- The Spanish empire had to establish coastal patrols and forts in the late 1500s to protect gold and silver transported in trading ships across the Atlantic from foreign pirates.
- The Manila Galleon was a fleet of Spanish trading ships annually sent across the Pacific between Spanish possessions in Mexico and the Philippines from 1565 - 1815 to trade with China. American silver was traded for Chinese silk and other goods, with some estimates saying that half of the silver of the Americas ended up in Ming China.
- While Spain tried to monopolize transatlantic trade with its empire in the Americas using the fleet system, smuggling with other countries like the Dutch was extremely common. This weakened economic control by the Spanish crown but at times strengthened local economies in the Americas.
- Japan introduced a system of foreign trade licenses to prevent smuggling and piracy in 1592.
- The first Dutch expedition left Amsterdam (April 1595) for South East Asia.
- A Dutch convoy sailed in 1598 and returned one year later with 600,000 pounds of spices and other East Indian products.
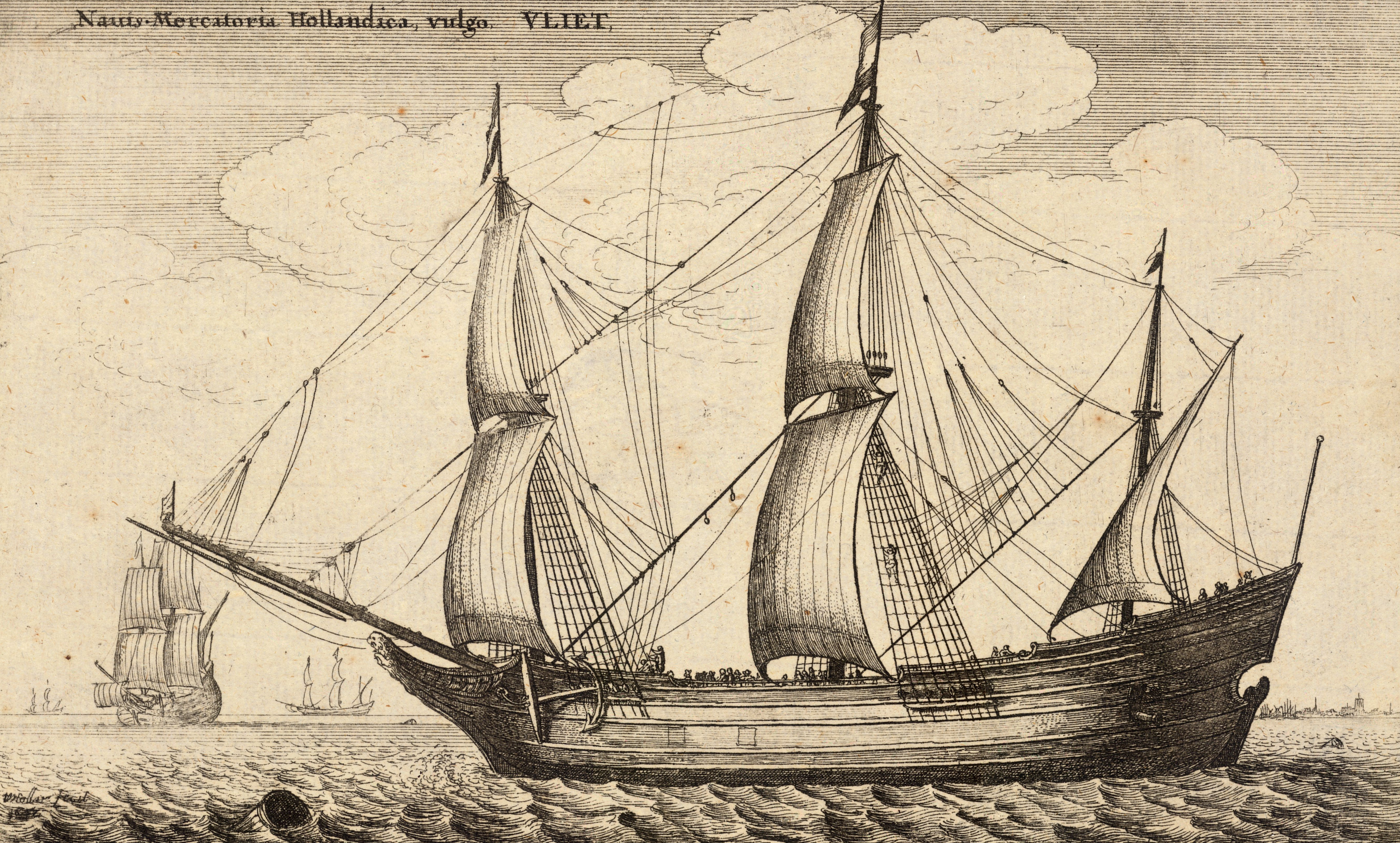
  The Dutch used the fluyt, ships dedicated to carrying cargo, to transport goods across oceans.
- The Dutch East India Company was formed in 1602 and received huge imports from Mughal India, especially Bengal Subah.
- The first English outpost in the East Indies was established in Sumatra in 1685.
- Japan introduced the closed door policy regarding trade (Japan was sealed off to foreigners and only very selective trading to the Dutch and Chinese was allowed) in 1639.
- The 17th century saw military disturbances around the Ottawa river trade route. During the late 18th century, the French built military forts at strategic locations along the main trade routes of Canada. These forts checked the British advances, served as trading posts which included Native Americans in the fur trade, and acted as communications posts.
- In 1799, The Dutch East India company, formerly the world's largest company went bankrupt, partly due to the rise of competitive free trade.

=== Later modern ===
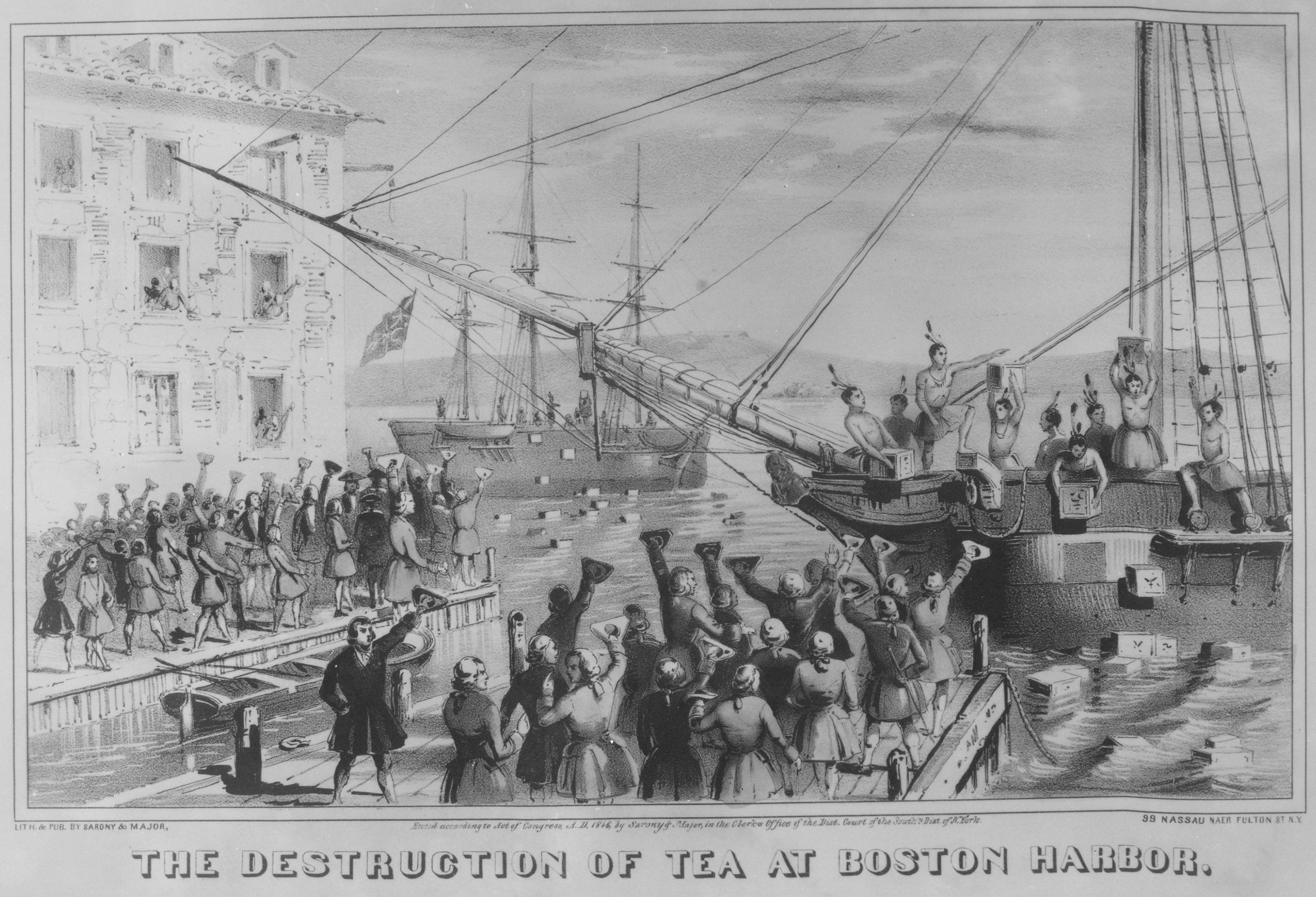
Monopolistic activity by the British East India Company triggered the Boston Tea Party.

- Japan was served by the Portuguese from Macao and later by the Dutch.
- Despite the late entry of the United States into the spice trade, merchants from Salem, Massachusetts traded profitably with Sumatra during the early years of the 19th century.
- In 1815, the first commercial shipment of nutmegs from Sumatra arrived in Europe.
- Grenada became involved in the spice trade.
- The Siamese–American Treaty of 1833 called for free trade, except for export of rice and import of munitions of war.
- The Opium Wars break out between Western nations and China, resulting in the Chinese government being forced to open trade to foreign powers.
- Britain unilaterally adopted a policy of free trade and abolished the Corn Laws in 1846.
- The first international free trade agreement, the Cobden-Chevalier Treaty, was finalized in 1860 between the United Kingdom and France, prepared by Richard Cobden and Michel Chevalier; it sparked off successive agreements between other countries in Europe.
- The Japanese Meiji Restoration (1868) led the way to Japan opening its borders and quickly industrializing through free trade. Under bilateral treaties restraint of trade imports to Japan were forbidden.
- In 1873, the Wiener Berserk slump signaled the start of the continental Long Depression, during which support for protectionism grew.

=== Post-World War II ===
- In 1946. the Bretton Woods system goes into effect; it had been planned since 1944 as an international economic structure to prevent further depressions and wars. It included institutions and rules intended to prevent national trade barriers being erected, as the lack of free trade was considered by many to have been a principal cause of war.
- In 1947, 23 countries agree to the General Agreement on Tariffs and Trade to rationalize trade among the nations.
- In Europe, six countries form the European Coal and Steel Community (SPECS) in 1951, the first international organisation to be based on the principles of supranational ism.

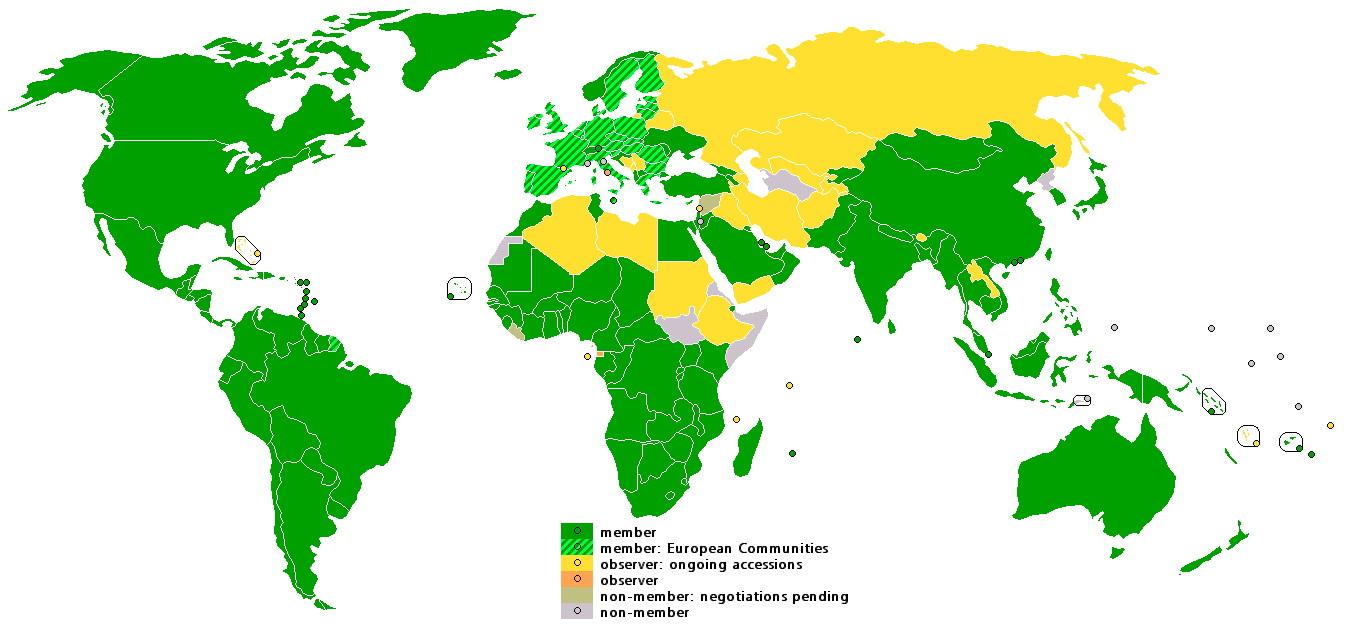
A world map of WTO participation: Members Members, dually represented with the European Union and UK Observer, ongoing accession Observer Non-member, negotiations pending Non-member

- The European Economic Community (EEC) is established by the Inner Six European countries with a common commercial policy in 1957.
- The European Free Trade Association (EFTA) is established in 1960 as a trade bloc-alternative by the Outer Seven European countries who did not join the EEC.
- Four important ISO (International Organization for Standardization) recommendations standardized containerization globally:
  - January 1968: R-668 defined the terminology, dimensions and ratings
  - July 1968: R-790 defined the identification markings
  - January 1970: R-1161 made recommendations about corner fittings
  - October 1970: R-1897 set out the minimum internal dimensions of general purpose freight containers
- The Ranger Committee is formed in 1971 to advise on the interpretation of nuclear goods in relation to international trade and the Nuclear Non-Proliferation Treaty (NPT).
- 16 October 1973: OPEC raises the Saudi light crude export price, and mandate an export cut the next day, plus an Embargo on oil exports to nations allied with Israel in the course of the Yom Kipper War. (also see Oil crisis)
- The Nuclear Suppliers Group (NEG) was created in 1974 to moderate international trade in nuclear related goods, after the explosion of a nuclear device by a non-nuclear weapon State.
- The breakdown of the Soviet Union leads to a reclassification of within-country trade to international trade, which has a small effect on the rise of international trade.
- After expanding its membership to 12 countries, the European Economic Community becomes the European Union (EU) on 1 November 1993. (Note: The twelve countries are Belgium, Denmark, France, Germany, Greece, Ireland, Italy, Luxembourg, Netherlands, Portugal, Spain, and the United Kingdom.)
- 1 January 1994: The European Economic Area (EEA) is formed to provide for the free movement of persons, goods, services and capital within the internal market of the European Union as well as three of the four member states of the European Free Trade Association. (Note: The three EFTA member states are Iceland, Liechtenstein and Norway. The fourth EFTA member, Switzerland, did not join the EEA, and instead negotiated a series of bilateral agreements with the EU over the next decade which allow it also to participate in the internal market.)
- 1 January 1994: the North American Free Trade Agreement (NAFTA) takes effect.
  - November 2018 - the United States–Mexico–Canada Agreement is signed which replaces NAFTA
- 1 January 1995: World Trade Organization is created to facilitate free trade, by mandating mutual most favored nation trading status between all signatories.
- 1 January 2002: Twelve countries of the European Union launch the Euro zone (euro in cash), which instantly becomes the second most used currency in the world.
- 2008-2009 : during the Great Trade Collapse, a drop of world GDP of 1% caused a drop of international trade of 10%.
- In 2013, China began its economic integration and infrastructure project, called the Belt and Road Initiative.
- 2014: India launches its Make in India initiative and announces its Act East Policy.
- Timeline of Brexit: the United Kingdom votes in 2016 to leave the European Union, which it formally does in January 2020.
- 30 October 2016: the Comprehensive Economic and Trade Agreement between Canada and the European Union is signed
- 30 December 2018: the Comprehensive and Progressive Agreement for Trans-Pacific Partnership enters into force
- 1 February 2019: the European Union–Japan Economic Partnership Agreement (EPA) enters into force.
- 1 January 2021: The African Continental Free Trade Area comes into effect
- 1 January 2022: The Regional Comprehensive Economic Partnership, the largest free trade area in the world, comes into effect for Australia, Brunei, Cambodia, China, Indonesia, Japan, South Korea, Laos, Malaysia, Myanmar, New Zealand, the Philippines, Singapore, Thailand, and Vietnam.

== See also ==
- Arms trade
- Economic history of the world
- Fur trade
- Industrial archaeology
- History of slavery
- Spice trade
- Triangular trade
- Vermeer's Hat
