= Regionalisation =

Tendency to form decentralised regions

Regionalisation is the tendency to form decentralised regions.

Regionalisation or land classification may refer to different concepts in various disciplines:

- In biogeography, see Biogeographic units
- In ecology, see Ecological classification
- In geography, see Regional geography or Area studies
- In globalisation discourse, see global regionalization
- In politics, see Regionalism (politics)
- In sport, see Home venue
- In linguistics, it is when a prestige language adopts features of a regional language

== See also ==
- Regionalism (disambiguation)
- Regional autonomy
- Autonomous administrative division
