= Controversy over the recognition of Limburgish as a regional language =

The recognition of Limburgish as a regional language in the Netherlands in 1997 has been the subject of considerable linguistic, legal, and political controversy. The decision by the Dutch government, made under the European Charter for Regional or Minority Languages (ECRML) of the Council of Europe, gave official recognition to the various dialects of the Dutch province of Limburg.

Although widely welcomed by regional cultural organisations, the recognition has attracted criticism from linguists, language-policy institutions, and commentators who questioned the lack of a substantive linguistic assessment and consultation prior to recognition, as well as the linguistic justification for recognising the Limburgish dialects, its compatibility with the Charter's provisions, and the inconsistency with the Dutch government's subsequent refusal to recognise other regional language varieties.

The Dutch government subsequently formally distanced itself from the procedure underlying the recognition of Limburgish. In 2000, it acknowledged that the 1997 decision had been procedurally flawed, taken primarily in response to the wishes of the provincial government and without a substantive assessment, while upholding its recognition of Limburgish as a regional language.

== Background ==
Limburgish is a conventional collective designation for a range of dialects spoken mainly in, and taking their name, the southeastern Dutch province of Limburg and the adjacent Belgian province of Limburg. The broader linguistic region forms part of a dialect continuum, rather than a territory with a single, sharply bounded linguistic variety and while traditionally and typically classified within Dutch dialectology, several Limburgish varieties exhibit distinctive features, including forms of tonal accent, that distinguish them from Standard Dutch. Additionally, dialect use is comparatively high in Dutch Limburg, a province with a comparatively recent, but nevertheless strong regional identity.

Following the Netherlands’ recognition of Low Saxon, a working group established on the initiative of the Dutch Province of Limburg through the local dialect association Veldeke examined whether Limburgish could similarly be recognized as a regional language under the European Charter for Regional or Minority Languages. Rather than assessing Limburgish directly against the Charter's criteria, the working group drew comparisons with Low Saxon, concluding that Limburgish exhibited a comparable degree of distinctiveness from Standard Dutch and had a similarly large speaker population. On this basis, the group recommended recognition under Part II of the Charter. The Province of Limburg submitted its request in 1996, which the Dutch government approved without further substantive assessment. In March 1997, Limburgish (legally defined as “the various dialects spoken in the Dutch province of Limburg”) was formally registered under the Charter.

In contrast to languages recognized under Part III (such as Frisian), those under Part II cannot derive specific legal rights from this recognition. However, it is stipulated that their use must be encouraged by the government.

== Criticism ==
=== Procedural errors ===
The procedure underlying the Dutch government's recognition of Limburgish as a regional language has attracted criticism over the absence of a substantive linguistic assessment, insufficient consultation with relevant language-policy institutions, and the inconsistent application of recognition criteria. Although a provincial working group had prepared a report supporting recognition in 1996, the Dutch government acknowledged in 2000 that it had not independently assessed whether Limburgish constituted a separate language or a variety of Dutch within the meaning of Article 1 of the European Charter for Regional or Minority Languages. Instead, the decision had been taken primarily in response to the wishes of the provincial government. It also conceded that consulting the Dutch Language Union before recognition would have been appropriate.

These procedural shortcomings became particularly contentious because the Charter explicitly excludes dialects of official languages from its scope. The Dutch Language Union subsequently challenged the linguistic and legal justification for recognising Limburgish, with its objections endorsed by the Council for Dutch Language and Literature. In response, the Dutch government agreed that future applications for regional-language recognition would be submitted to the Language Union for advice. The subsequent rejection of Zeelandic in 2004, based on linguistic and Charter eligibility criteria that had not been substantively examined in the Limburgish case, further raised questions about the consistency of the government's decision-making process.

=== Linguistic issues ===
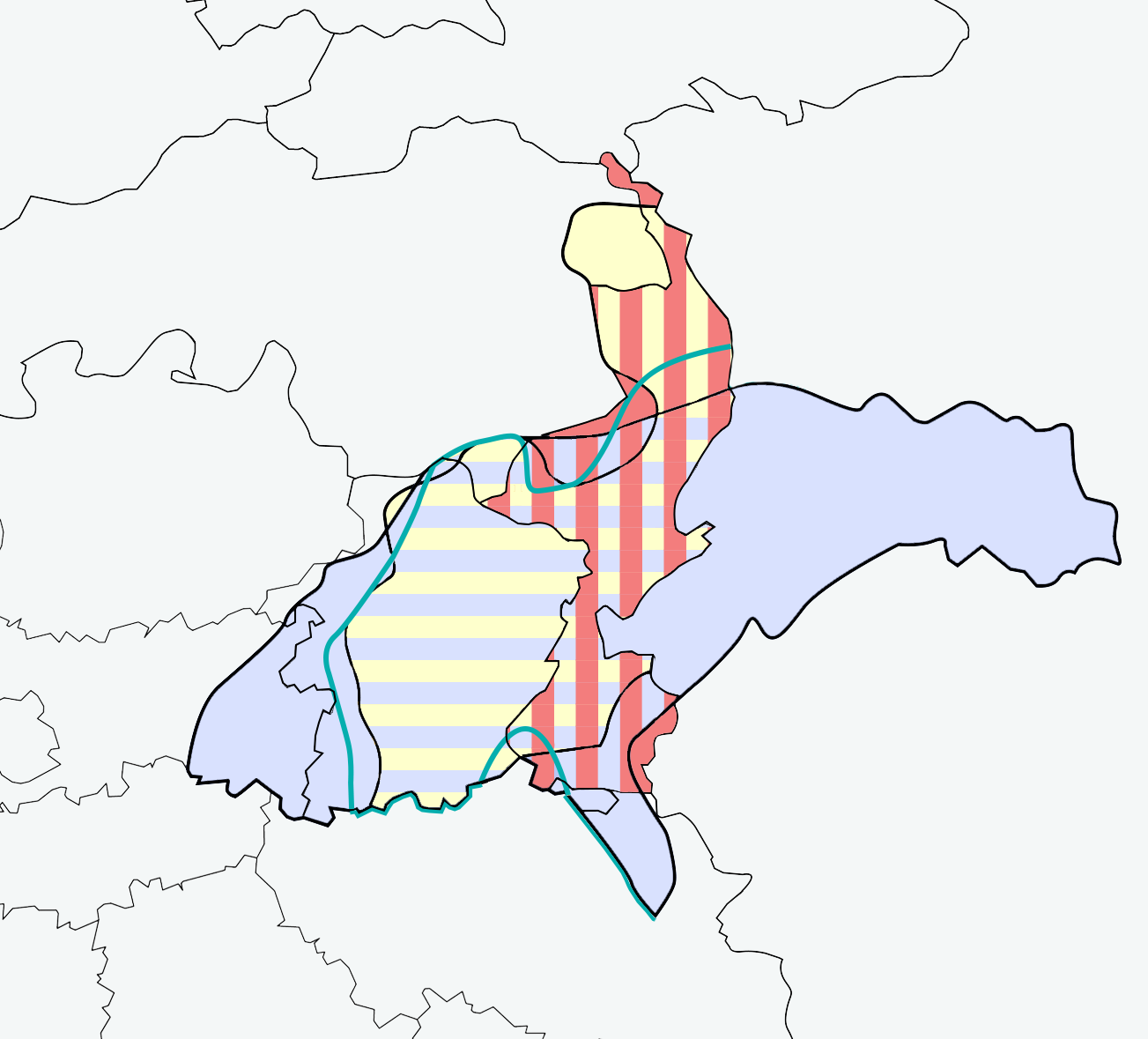
Overlap and Delimitation between East Low Franconian and Various Definitions of “Limburgish”: East Low Franconian including transitional dialects, without internal subdivisions. The "Limburg group" (without internal subdivisions) based on the feature frequency method. The area where local dialects are defined as "Limburgish" by the Dutch state and protected as regional language. Definition of Limburgish based on tonality within the broader Dutch language area.

The recognition of Limburgish as a regional language has raised questions about its supposed linguistic definition and geographical boundaries. Linguists have noted that Limburgish as legally defined by the Dutch government does not constitute a homogeneous linguistic variety but encompasses a diverse group of dialects whose boundaries do not correspond to those of the Dutch province of Limburg. Although most Limburgish dialects are traditionally classified as East Low Franconian, parts of northern Limburg speak varieties more closely associated with Kleverlandish, while southeastern varieties belong to the Ripuarian dialect group. Conversely, Limburgish is also spoken in the neighbouring province of Belgian Limburg and closely related dialect varieties are spoken in adjacent parts of Germany. The recognition has therefore been criticised for treating a politically defined territory as a coherent linguistic unit, encompassing varieties that fall outside traditional dialectological definitions of Limburgish while excluding closely related varieties beyond the provincial border.

The different legal status of Limburgish dialects in the Netherlands and Belgium has further illustrated the political dimension of language recognition. Despite their close linguistic relationship, the varieties spoken in Belgian Limburg have not received equivalent recognition under the European Charter for Regional or Minority Languages. Following the Dutch decision in 1997, the provincial authorities of Belgian Limburg sought comparable recognition, but the initiative encountered opposition from the Dutch Language Union, while Belgium did not sign or ratify the Charter. Scholars have consequently highlighted the inconsistency of assigning different legal statuses to closely related dialects on opposite sides of a national border.

Furthermore, scholars have challenged the notion that Limburgish historically constituted a homogeneous linguistic community, arguing that its emergence as a distinct regional language reflects a broader process of identity formation during the nineteenth and twentieth centuries. As Limburg became increasingly integrated into the Dutch nation-state, diverse local dialects came to be associated with a shared provincial identity, shaped partly by perceived cultural and religious differences from the rest of the Netherlands, particularly the provinces of North and South Holland. The subsequent promotion of Limburgish by regional institutions further reinforced the perception of these dialects as belonging to a coherent linguistic community.

=== Efficacy ===
A recurring controversy concerns whether the recognition of the dialects of Limburg has produced sufficient practical benefits for its speakers or has been largely symbolic. Critics of the existing framework contend that Part II recognition, while culturally significant, has not resulted in sufficiently strong or coordinated measures to support Limburgish in education, public administration, and other institutional settings. Supporters of stronger protection argue that without sustained public policy, the number of speakers of Limburgish may decline despite its officially recognised status.

The Dutch government has generally maintained that Part II provides an adequate framework for protecting regional languages, although its effectiveness depends on implementation on a provincial level. In 2019, the national government and the province of Limburg concluded the Convenant inzake de Nederlandse erkenning van de Limburgse taal (Covenant on the Dutch Recognition of the Limburgish Language), am explicitly non-legally binding document, which reaffirmed Limburgish as a regional language within the Netherlands and committed the authorities to cooperation in promoting its continued use.
