= Commercial policy =

Government's policy governing international trade

A commercial policy (also referred to as a trade policy or international trade policy) is a government's policy governing international trade. Commercial policy is an all encompassing term that is used to cover topics which involve international trade. Trade policy is often described in terms of a scale between the extremes of free trade (no restrictions on trade) on one side and protectionism (high restrictions to protect local producers) on the other. A common commercial policy can sometimes be agreed by treaty within a customs union, as with the European Union's common commercial policy and in Mercosur. A nation's commercial policy will include and take into account the policies adopted by that nation's government while negotiating international trade. There are several factors that can affect a nation's commercial policy, all of which can affect international trade policies.

== Theories on international trade policy ==
Trade policy has been controversial since the days of mercantilism. Economics (or political economy) has developed in major part as an effort to make clear various effects of trade policies. See International trade theory. The hottest topic in economic policy is upgrading in Global Value Chains.

== Types and aspects of Commercial policy ==
=== Regionalism ===
Regionalism, or Regional Trade Agreements (RTA), are trade policies and agreements that are crafted by the nations in a region for the purposes of increasing international trade in the area. RTAs have been described by supporters as a means of increasing free trade with the goal of eventually merging into larger, either bilateral or multilateral, trade deals. The more relatively local area of RTAs are useful in resolving trade issues as well without causing gridlock in other trade agreements. Critics of RTAs say that they are a hindrance to the negotiation of trade because they can be lopsided or unfairly beneficial to one side over the other sides, particularly if some of the participants are nations that are still in development.

As China was rising in economic power and prominence, they turned to regionalism as a strategic method of leveling the playing field with Europe and the United States. In 2000, China signed the Bangkok agreement with the Association of Southeast Asian Nations (ASEAN) to reduce tariffs in the region. The signing of the agreement also began the push for a formal Free Trade Agreement between China and ASEAN. However, strained relations between China and other Asian nations such as Japan have prevented the same level of regional FTAs to be put in place with Northeast Asia.

=== Bilateral Free Trade Agreements ===
A bilateral Free Trade Agreement is when two countries agree to exchange goods to promote trade and investments elimination barriers such as tariffs, import quotas, and export restrains. The United States has signed such treaties as the North American Free Trade Agreement in 1994 as well as with Israel in the 1980s. Experts who support such free trade agreements argue that these agreements increase competition while offering business the ability to reach larger markets. Critics of bilateral agreements claim that a larger nation, such as the United States, can use these agreements to unfairly push smaller states into much harsher work loads than the World Trade Organization already requires.

Relations between the European Union and South Korea have led to both parties signing several bilateral agreements regarding trade policy. In 2009, South Korea and the EU signed the EU-Korea Free Trade Agreement. The signing of the agreement created an FTA that is second only to NAFTA in size. The agreement held the benefits of increased free trade between the participants in the FTA as well as increased challenge to the United States.

=== Preferential Trade Agreements ===
Preferential agreements are trade deals that involve nations making deals with specific countries that can aid the interests of one another as opposed to the nondiscriminatory deals that are pushed by the WTO. Nations have been increasingly preferring such deals since the 1950s as they are quicker to show gains for the parties involved in the agreements. A common argument that has been made is that it allows businesses to open up markets that would otherwise be considered closed and therefore falls into the free trade idea that most countries will push for. Countries that have similar levels of GDP and a higher scope in their economies as well as their relative position to one another and the rest of the world are more likely to have preferential trade agreements. PTAs can also be applied to regional areas with unions such as NAFTA, the European Union, and ASEAN being examples of regional PTAs.

Those who opposer PTAs argue that these deals have increased the importance of where a product is made so that tariffs can be applied accordingly. The certification of a product's origin also unfairly holds back smaller countries that have less resources to spend. Others argue that PTAs can hinder negotiations of trade disputes and places an emphasis of which country has more power.

== Ways in which commercial policy is affected ==
=== Tariffs ===
Trade tariffs are a tax that are placed on the import of foreign goods. Tariffs increase the price of imports and are usually levied onto the country the goods are being imported from. Governments will use tariffs as a way to promote competition within their own country with businesses of the foreign country that wishes to sell their goods or services. In some instances, a country's government will use them as a means of protectionism for their own interests. In modern history, generally starting at the mid-20th century, the use of tariffs has been largely diminished in favor of the rise of international trade. Beginning in 2017, the Trump administration began to impose tariffs on several of nations that were involved in trade deals with the United States. The countries targeted by the Trump Tariffs then retaliated with their own tariffs on American goods.

=== Import Quotas ===
Import quotas are the limitations of the amount of goods that can be imported into the country from foreign businesses. Generally, an import quota is set for a specific period of time with one year being the most common metric. Some versions of the quotas limits the quantity of specific goods being imported into a country while other versions place the limit on the value of those goods. The objectives of quotas can include: the protections of a nations interests, ensuring a balance of trade so as not to create deficits, retaliation to restrictive trade policies of other countries that do business on the international playing field.
