= Common commercial policy =

Type of economic policy

A common commercial policy involves several states coordinating some or all aspects of their trade policy.

It is sometimes agreed by treaty within a customs union. In the case of the European Union, a form of the EU's common commercial policy has been in place since 1957.

A common commercial policy is also an aim of Mercosur.
