= Regional autonomy =

Decentralization of governance to outlying regions

Regional autonomy is the authority of a region to govern and administer the interests of the local people according to its own initiatives.

21st-century examples of disputes over autonomy include the Basque Country and Catalonia in Spain, Sicily in Italy, and the disputes over autonomy of provinces in Indonesia. Other examples of autonomous regions include the Guangxi Zhuang Autonomous Region in China and the Cherokee Nation in the United States.

There is also an example of Sri Lanka where the Sri Lankan Tamils asked for regional autonomy and the government declined it, leading to a struggle by the Tamil community.

== See also ==
- Autonomous administrative division
- List of autonomous areas by country
- Devolution
- Regionalism (politics)
- Regionalism (disambiguation)
