= Great Trade Collapse =

The Great Trade Collapse, a consequence of the 2008 financial crisis, occurred between the third quarter of 2008 and the second quarter of 2009. During this time, world GDP dropped by 1% and world trade dropped by 10%. This drop in global trade was synchronized across almost every country in the world. Researchers cite three main reasons for the collapse: sudden drops in demand and supply, credit constraint, and a stifled global value chain.

== See also ==
- Financial crisis
