= Regionalism =

Regionalism may refer to:

- Regionalism (art), an American realist modern art movement that was popular during the 1930s
- Regionalism (international relations), the expression of a common sense of identity and purpose combined with the creation and implementation of institutions that express a particular identity and shape collective action within a geographical region
- Regionalism (politics), a political ideology that focuses on the interests of a particular region or group of regions, whether traditional or formal
- Critical regionalism, in architecture, an approach that strives to counter placelessness and lack of identity in modern architecture by using the building's geographical context

== Literature ==
- American literary regionalism, refers to fiction or poetry that focuses on specific features – including characters, dialects, customs, history, and landscape – of a particular region
- British regional literature
- Criollismo, a literary movement

== See also ==
- Bioregionalism, regions defined by physical or environmental features
