= Common Commercial Policy (EU) =

EU policy

The European Union's (EU) Common Commercial Policy, or EU Trade Policy, is the policy whereby EU member states delegate authority to the European Commission to negotiate their external trade relations, with the aim of increasing trade amongst themselves and their bargaining power vis-à-vis the rest of the world. The Common Commercial Policy is logically necessitated by the existence of the Customs Union, which in turn is also the foundation upon which the Single Market and Monetary Union were later established.

== History ==
The six original member states had signed the 1957 Treaty of Rome, establishing the EU's forerunner, the European Economic Community, with the aim of facilitating increased interstate trade and investment and strengthening their collective bargaining power with outside states. As signatories to the General Agreement on Tariffs and Trade (GATT), the removal of tariffs between them required the formation of a customs union, with a common external tariff applied by all members to their trade with the rest of the world. Customs unions of the past, such as the Southern African Customs Union, had relied upon a dominant partner, in that case South Africa, to set the external tariff vis-à-vis the rest of the world on behalf of junior states in the arrangement. In sharp contrast, the Community member states decided that they would jointly share in the management of a common external commercial policy by delegating authority to the commonly appointed supranational body of the European Commission, and scrutinising its decisions via the common institutions they had established – namely, the Council of Ministers, and later, additionally, the European Parliament.

The common commercial policy officially came into existence in July 1968 alongside the common external tariff, following the 12-year grace period for the 1957 Treaty of Rome's signatory states to align their trade policies. In practice, however, member states had sought to take advantage of their combined bargaining strength prior to this. This included the Commission concluding, a Free Trade Agreements (FTAs) and Association Agreements at the bilateral level, including, amongst others, with Israel in 1964, as well within the multilateral Kennedy Round of GATT negotiations, lasting from 1963 to 1967.

In the decades since the establishment of the EU's Common Commercial Policy, the European Commission has developed expertise in international trade through its Directorate-General for Trade (DG Trade). Along with the United States, it is one of a small number of entities able to negotiate complex trade agreements in parallel. The European Union was also a founding member of the World Trade Organization (WTO). Former European Commissioner for Competition (1985–1989) Peter Sutherland served as the WTO's first director-general, and European Commissioner for Trade Pascal Lamy (1999–2004) later held the same position.

=== Treaty on the Functioning of the European Union ===
Article 207(1) of the Treaty on the Functioning of the European Union (TFEU) states:

"The common commercial policy shall be based on uniform principles, particularly with regard to changes in tariff rates, the conclusion of tariff and trade agreements relating to trade in goods and services, and the commercial aspects of intellectual property, foreign direct investment, the achievement of uniformity in measures of liberalisation, export policy and measures to protect trade such as those to be taken in the event of dumping or subsidies. The common commercial policy shall be conducted in the context of the principles and objectives of the Union's external action."

Article 63 states:

"...all restrictions on the movement of capital between the Member States and between Member States and third countries shall be prohibited."

Whether Article 63 confers to third-country investors rights similar in scope to those of intra-EU investors is uncertain.

== Accountability ==
Historically, as laid down in the 1957 Treaty of Rome, the European Commissioner for Trade, acting on behalf of the European Commission, has always had to first seek approval from the member state governments in the Council of Ministers (now Council of the EU), before either taking retaliatory trade measures (e.g. anti-dumping) or conducting trade negotiations. This, has, since the inception of the Common Commercial Policy occurred by qualified majority voting, though the Council tends to act by consensus when possible.

The Lisbon reform Treaty further clarified what was already the case by defining the Common Commercial Policy as an exclusive competence, only to be acted upon by member states at the EU level.

=== European Parliament ===
Successive treaty changes have also empowered the European Parliament in the trade realm. Today the decision-making process for the implementation of EU Common Commercial Policy is under the auspices of the Ordinary Legislative Procedure (formerly called the co-decision procedure):

The European Parliament and the Council, acting by means of regulations in accordance with the ordinary legislative procedure, shall adopt the measures defining the framework for implementing the common commercial policy.

— Art. 207:2 TFEU

This necessitates the European Commission, in order to take any actions within the Common Commercial Policy, to first table a legislative proposal, usually drafted by DG Trade, to the relevant European Parliamentary committees (the most relevant being the International Trade Committee) eventually making its way to a full vote of the plenary, and simultaneously submit it to the Council of EU working parties and EU member state ministers. Both the European Parliament and the Council of the EU have powers to amend said proposal and must agree on a common final text.

=== Mixed agreements ===
With global tariffs falling, and an increasingly integrated and complex Single Market, European Union member states have shown a growing appetite to conclude bilateral and multilateral agreements that do not pertain to exclusive competences of the Union, such as agreements on investment and intellectual property with third countries. Such trade deals are said to be "mixed agreements" and include the member states themselves as signatories, rather than just the EU. Owing to a different legal basis within the EU treaties, the elements that do not fall under exclusive competence require unanimity in the Council of the EU and must be ratified by the respective constitutional arrangements of the EU member states, usually requiring the consent of national parliaments, and depending on the issue, may include regional parliaments or even referendums. For the elements that fall outside exclusive competences, the European Parliament loses its amendment powers, but usually retains an overall veto via the Special Legislative Procedures laid down in the treaties for the scrutiny of EU foreign relations.

=== Trade and foreign policy ===
The EU is also held to account in the way it conducts its commercial policy and general foreign relations via Article 3:5 TEU, which states that:

In its relations with the wider world, the Union shall uphold and promote its values and interests and contribute to the protection of its citizens. It shall contribute to peace, security, the sustainable development of the Earth, solidarity and mutual respect among peoples, free and fair trade, eradication of poverty and the protection of human rights, in particular the rights of the child, as well as to the strict observance and the development of international law, including respect for the principles of the United Nations Charter.

— Art 3:5 TEU

How this might influence the EU's Common Commercial Policy in the future is not clear.

=== Trade, employment and growth ===
The European Commission sought through a 2016 Communication to maintain the importance of fairness in world trade dealings in the face of "unprecedented" levels of dumping of imported products, and to ensure that EU trade policy was consistent with the aims of protecting jobs and promoting economic growth within the EU.

== See also ==
- Anti-Coercion Instrument
- EU Common Foreign and Security Policy
- European Union free trade agreements
- European Commissioner for Trade
- European Parliament Committee on International Trade
