= Regionalism (international relations) =

Concept in international relations theory

In international relations, regionalism is the expression of a common sense identity and purpose combined with the creation and implementation of institutions that express a particular identity and shape collective action within a geographical region. Regionalism is one of the three constituents of the international commercial system (along with multilateralism and unilateralism).

The first coherent regional initiatives began in the 1950s and 1960s, but they accomplished little, except in Western Europe with the establishment of the European Community. Some analysts call these initiatives "old regionalism". In the late 1980s, a new bout of regional integration (also called "new regionalism") began and continues still . A new wave of political initiatives prompting regional integration took place worldwide during the last two decades. Regional and bilateral trade deals have also mushroomed after the failure of the Doha round.

The European Union can be classified as a result of regionalism. The idea that lies behind this increased regional identity is that as a region becomes more economically integrated, it will necessarily become politically integrated as well. The European example is especially valid in this light, as the European Union as a political body grew out of more than 40 years of economic integration within Europe. The precursor to the EU, the European Economic Community (EEC) was entirely an economic entity.

== Definition ==
Joseph Nye defined an international region "as a limited number of states linked by a geographical relationship and by a degree of mutual interdependence", and (international) regionalism as "the formation of interstate associations or groupings on the basis of regions". This definition, however, was never unanimously accepted, and some analysts noted, for example, that the plethora of regional organizations founded at the initiative of developing countries had not fostered the rapid growth of regionalism in the Third World. Other authors, such as Ernst B. Haas, stressed the need to distinguish the notions of regional cooperation, regional system, regional organization and regional integration and regionalism.

== History ==
Initiatives towards a closer regional integration date back to the 1880s. The first coherent regionalism initiatives, however, took place during the 1950s and 1960s. During the late 1990s, however, a renewed interest in regionalism emerged and lead to the rapid emergence of a global system of regions with political and economic parameters.

=== Origins ===
It is quite difficult to define when the history of regionalism begins, since there is no single explanation that encompasses the origins and development of the regional idea. Criteria such as the desire by states to "make the best of their regional environment" are regarded by certain analystas as elusive; they prefer to consider the history of regionalism in terms of the rise of modern institutions. If formal organization at the regional as opposed to the international level is to be the yardstick for the onset of regionalism, it is difficult to place its origins much before 1945.

=== Before 1945 ===
Advocacy of international regionalism was rare in the period between World War I and according to Al Marucut(1998) World War II when the doctrine of collective security was dominant. With the notable exception of the Inter-American System very few regional groupings existed before World War II What did emerge before World War II were a growing number of international public and private associations, such as the General Postal Union and the International Law Association, which were holding regular meetings and had their own secretariats.

=== 1945–1980 ===
By the end of the Second World War, then, regionalism had not still entered the vocabulary of international relations. By the 1940s however, an increasing number of influential people had already advocated "escape from a theoretical and ineffective universalism into practical and workable regionalism". The region as a unit of analysis became important not only in the Cold War context, but also as a result of the self-consciousness of regions themselves. Because of the subsequent demands by states that had already made heavy political investments in regional arrangements such as the Inter-American System, the Commonwealth and the Arab League, regionalism made its appearance even in the finalized UN Charter.^{[a]}

==== European initiatives ====
European regionalism took a concrete form during the late 1940s. The treaty establishing the Benelux Customs Union was signed in 1944 by the governments in exile of Belgium, Netherlands and Luxembourg in London, and entered into force in 1947. In 1952, Denmark, Sweden, Iceland and Norway (Finland joined in 1955) established the Nordic Council, an interparliamentary organization with the goal to forge the regional Nordic co-operation. The Nordic Council's statutes set out in the 1962 Helsinki Agreement, according to which the parties undertake "to seek to preserve and further develop co-operation between our nations in the legal, cultural and financial areas as well as in matters relating to transport and protection of the environment".

In the 1951 Treaty of Paris, France, West Germany, Italy, Belgium, Luxembourg and the Netherlands established the European Coal and Steel Community (ECSC) to pool the steel and coal resources of its member-states. The same states established on March 25, 1957 by the signing of the Treaty of Rome the European Atomic Energy Community and the European Economic Community, most important of two European Communities.

==== New challenges ====
The growing success of European regionalism in particular led scholars in the late 1950s to what Ernst called "the new challenge of regionalism, ... the potentialities of the field for insights into the process of community formation at the international level". By the late 1950s, "the organization of the world's ninety-odd states into various systems of competing and overlapping regional associations [had been] a fact of international relations for over ten years".

Regionalism had already given rise to a floodtide of literature critical of its development or determined to justify it as a necessity for world security. Some critics were arguing that economic unions and common markets distorted the logic of a universal division of labor, and that regional military planning was made both impossible and obsolete. On the other hand, the defenders of the pattern were invoking the necessities of the cold war. By the 1960s a number of important changes in international politics – the easing of the intensity of the Cold War, the independence of new states that had been part of colonial empires, the successful initiation of the European integration experience – gave rise to a new range of questions about regionalism. According to Nye the new international environment made "the collective security and military defense focus of the writings in the early 1950s seem at best quaint and at worst misleading".

=== After the 1980s ===
Since the late 1980s globalization has changed the international economic environment for regionalism. The renewed academic interest in regionalism, the emergence of new regional formations and international trade agreements like the North American Free Trade Agreement (NAFTA), and the development of a European Single Market demonstrate the upgraded importance of a region-by-region basis political cooperation and economic competitiveness.

The African Union was launched on July 9, 2002 and a proposal for a North American region was made in 2005 by the Council on Foreign Relations' Independent Task Force on the Future of North America.

In Latin America, however the proposal to extend NAFTA into a Free Trade Area of the Americas that would stretch from Alaska to Argentina was ultimately rejected in particular by nations such as Venezuela, Ecuador and Bolivia. It has been superseded by the Union of South American Nations (UNASUR) which was constituted in 2008.

== Regionalization ==
Regionalism contrasts with regionalization, which is, according to the New Regionalism Approach, the expression of increased commercial and human transactions in a defined geographical region. Regionalism refers to an intentional political process, typically led by governments with similar goals and values in pursuit of the overall development within a region. Regionalization, however, is simply the natural tendency to form regions, or the process of forming regions due to similarities between states in a given geographical space.

== National politics ==
In national politics (or low politics), regionalism is a political notion which favours regionalization—a process of dividing a political entity (typically a country) into smaller regions, and transferring power from the central government to the regions. Opposite process is called unitarization.

== See also ==
- Localism
- Helen Milner
- Separatism
- Regionalism in Spain
- Middle Eastern Union

== Notes ==
a. According to the article 33 of the Chapter VI of the UN Charter, regional bodies are regarded as agencies of the first resort in dealing with disputed among their own members. The preliminary version of the UN Charter stipulated that "the existence of regional bodies for dealing with peace and security should not be precluded".
