= Global regionalization =

Process where large regions are divided into smaller ones

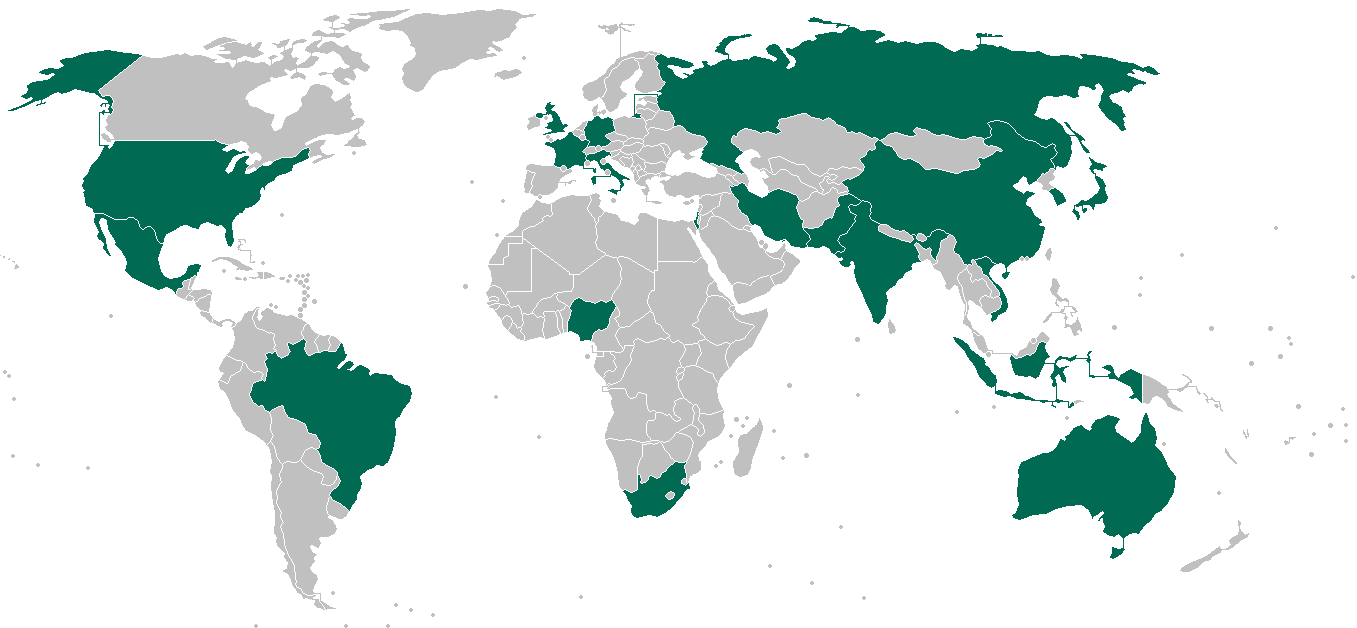
Global Regional Powers

Global regionalization is a process that parallels globalization, in which large regions are divided into smaller regions, areas, or districts.

Globalization can occur either globally or regionally. On a regional scale, an element of international relations in the 21st century is more localized development and cooperation. In this sense, regional factors are significant for international relations. Most changes seen in the contemporary world are associated with the development of an information sphere. Predictable cultural transformations led humanity to enter a global information society. An information society can be defined in terms of five factors that highlight changes in the world: technology, economy, employment, space, and culture. The significance of an information society includes its systematic impact on international relations. In 2000, the G-8 Summit in Okinawa adopted a Charter on Global Information Society, which reflected changes in the world information sphere. These same issues received much attention at the Millennium Summit.

== Regionalization as a trend in global development ==
The forces that drive regionalization are state and non-governmental structures—economic interest groups, NGOs, political parties, and so on. Regionalism can be viewed as a manifestation of globalization, while also participating in a contrary trend. Many developing countries use regionalization to mitigate global competition. In the context of globalization, this becomes relevant as selective protectionism - gradual global economic integration reflecting openness to the rest of the world, along with some protection of national interests.

The following theories or doctrines reflect the process of regionalism: the multipolar world theory, the theory of large spaces, the theory of convergence, and the regional joint doctrine. The study of regionalism analyzes two phenomena:

- regionalization in response to the challenges of globalization, and
- regionalization as institutional integration, a process of merging national projects, which combines the social and political institutions of the state.

Institutional integration has multiple forms and types. These are characterized by the degree of freedom of movement among groups and factors of production. Currently known forms of regional economic integration include free trade area, customs union, single or common market, economic union, economic and monetary union, and others.

== Information society and international relations ==
In international relations, increased exposure to changes in the information sphere impacted several aspects of the information itself:

1. Information not only decreases (or disappears) in large-scale use, but is the starting point for forming new types and qualities.
2. Information is a fundamental principle for development and decision-making on all levels of government, including the level of global governance.
3. Information has an "Oedipus effect" (i.e., a self-fulfilling prophecy), which can influence the thoughts and behavior of individuals and society in general.

Development of the global information society is influenced by information and communication technologies (ICT), along with market globalization both domestically and internationally. Because of this influence, integrating the information society in a balanced way requires state-level coordination, since a state is deemed to best express the overall interests of society. Creating a global information society requires overcoming informational imbalances. These imbalances have two types: between countries and regions, and within countries or regions (e.g., between different social groups). Because of these differences, building the information society emphasizes different tasks in different countries. Due to intensified information exchange and its interplay with economic imbalances, the available information has increasing influence on politics, economics, and culture.

Al Gore, a former Vice President of the United States, coined the term "information superhighway" in 1993. In the area of information technology, high-ranking countries include Singapore, Finland, Sweden, Denmark, Canada, Switzerland, Norway, Australia and Iceland, as well as the United States. As another example, Russia is ranked sixth highest. Lower-ranking countries include Morocco, Egypt, Sri Lanka, Bulgaria, Vietnam, the Philippines, Peru, and Tanzania.

In consideration of these issues, Russia adopted the programme "Participation in international cultural exchange" as federal law. To remain among the countries that affect and largely define global politics, Russia must take a greater role in shaping the global information society. Accordingly, Russia drafted a resolution for the First Committee of the United Nations General Assembly in 2001: "Developments in the field of information and telecommunications in the context of international security". Nevertheless, according to the Institute of the Information Society, 64% of Russia's population feels no need to use the Internet. This figure was derived from two sources: (1) a methodology from the Center for International Development at Harvard University called "Readiness for the Networked World", and (2) the relevant domestic situation, including human capital, business climate and using of ICT in culture.

The preceding challenge seems to an effect of a resource economy. This effect is visible in comparing two global markets:

- the global oil market which is estimated at $650 billion (US dollars), of which Russia has a 16% share
- the global ICT market which is estimated at $1 trillion (US dollars), of which Russia's share is less than 1%.

The impact of the global information society on international relations is both positive and negative. As a key example, international cooperation can be less important for the media, which allows for audience feedback. International news programs are declining globally, partly due to high cost, and partly due to audience interest in consumer and crime programming. The media increasingly contribute to forming global opinions, which creates information patterns that can be used to assess globalization's achievements, as well as its risks and challenges. For example, the growth in media coverage of terrorism threats significantly exceeds actual terrorist activity. However, the media provide relatively less coverage of global issues such as water scarcity and human trafficking. These observations are important considerations for transforming information policy.

== Unrecognized states and globalization ==
Globalization has created new opportunities for states with limited recognition (or unrecognized states). In scientific publications, the list of currently unrecognized states is long. These include the Republic of China (Taiwan) and the Turkish Republic of Northern Cyprus. Frequent additions include the Republic of Somaliland, Tamil Eelam (Ceylon), and the Islamic State of Waziristan. Sometimes the concept refers to South Sudan, Kashmir, Western Sahara, Palestine, Kurdistan, and other areas. In this context, unrecognized states are typically understood as public entities that possess key attributes of statehood—territorial control, a control system, and practical sovereignty—but do not receive full or partial international diplomatic recognition; accordingly, such states lack the capacity to act with legal authority in international relations. Some authors prefer the term "de facto state" over the term "unrecognized state".

International legal support for national self-determination is enshrined in the Declaration on the Granting of Independence to Colonial Countries and Peoples (in 1960). The territorial integrity of states—the principle of inviolability of borders—was officially recognized by all European countries, the US, and Canada in the Conference on Security and Cooperation in Europe in Helsinki in 1975. When the international community expresses uncertainty toward an unrecognized state, this can weaken the state's legal status and operational capabilities. Such a state cannot participate actively in economic activities; it also cannot conclude trade contracts, arrange multilateral investment, or complete infrastructure projects. In their infancy, such areas depend on the international community for humanitarian aid, social and cultural projects, and cooperation with other countries and regions. Thus political and legal recognition for a territory depends on its existence and development.

A strong candidate for potential recognition is Kosovo. The area's independence is a pressing issue, since it concerns both the United States and the European Union. Kosovo's neighbor Serbia opposes such independence, but Serbia can only postpone it or perhaps negotiate political and economic concessions (such as the integration of Serbia into the EU). Still, if recognition of Kosovo is regarded as a special case, it could provide a significant precedent for countries facing problems with ethnic separatism. In this context, Abkhazia, Transnistria, and South Ossetia could rely on partial recognition by Russia, but their prospects are far from certain. Such semi-independence would probably not be recognized by the United States, the European Union, India, China, and other countries. Similarly, there is a low probability of changing the status of Nagorno-Karabakh. This situation is largely determined by the positions of the United States, the European Union, Russia, Iran, and Turkey.

Effectively solving the problem of unrecognized states will likely require clear, international, legal criteria; under such criteria, after a specified period of time, an unrecognized state could expect international recognition. In the absence of such legal criteria, unrecognized states already play a role in regional and international politics. Their influence on political processes is evident. Thus globalization has created new opportunities for the long-term existence of unrecognized states without formal recognition by other countries. This situation is gradually becoming the norm.

== Sources ==
- Victor Reutov. Global Regionalization as a Way to Counteraction the Global Financial Threats (PDF) (Report). Crimean Economic Institute, SHEE "Vadym Hetman Kyiv National Economic University" Simferopol.
