= International rankings of Malaysia =

The following are international rankings of Malaysia.

== Cities ==
- 2thinknow: Innovation Cities™ Index 2011, Kuala Lumpur ranked 67th in the world
- 2thinknow: Innovation Cities™ Index 2012, Kuala Lumpur ranked 66th in the world
- 2thinknow: Innovation Cities™ Index 2014, Kuala Lumpur and Petaling Jaya ranked 98th and 328th in the world respectively
- 2thinknow: Innovation Cities™ Index 2015, Kuala Lumpur and Petaling Jaya ranked 88th and 306th in the world respectively
- 2thinknow: Innovation Cities™ Index 2016, Kuala Lumpur and Petaling Jaya ranked 92nd and 331st in the world respectively
- 2thinknow: Innovation Cities™ Index 2018, Kuala Lumpur and Petaling Jaya ranked 99th and 362nd in the world respectively
- 2thinknow: Innovation Cities™ Index 2019, Kuala Lumpur and Petaling Jaya ranked 81st and 409th in the world respectively
- 2thinknow: Innovation Cities™ Index 2021, Kuala Lumpur and Petaling Jaya ranked 223rd and 467th in the world respectively
- 2thinknow: Innovation Cities™ Index 2023, Kuala Lumpur and Petaling Jaya ranked 163rd and 425th in the world respectively
- ADB: Asian Development Outlook 2019 Update Fostering Growth and Inclusion In Asia's Cities, Kuala Lumpur ranked 2nd out of 278 Asian cities for most congested cities
- Agoda: Top Summer Destinations By Middle East 2019, Kuala Lumpur ranked top 10 in the world
- Arcadis: International Construction Costs 2016, Kuala Lumpur ranked 41st out of 44 global cities
- Arcadis: International Construction Costs 2017, Kuala Lumpur ranked 43rd out of 44 global cities
- Arcadis: International Construction Costs 2018, Kuala Lumpur ranked 47th out of 50 global cities
- Arcadis: International Construction Costs 2019, Kuala Lumpur ranked 97th out of 100 global cities
- Arcadis: Sustainable Cities Index 2016, Kuala Lumpur ranked 55th out of 100 global cities
- Arcadis: Sustainable Cities Index 2017, Kuala Lumpur ranked 95th out of 100 global cities
- Arcadis: Sustainable Cities Index 2018, Kuala Lumpur ranked 67th out of 100 global cities
- ASEAN: Clean Tourist City Standard Award 2017, George Town and Muar both granted this award
- ASEAN: Clean Tourist City Standard Award 2020, Penang, Putrajaya and Kota Kinabalu all granted this award
- A.T. Kearney: Global Cities Index 2012, Kuala Lumpur ranked 49th out of 66 global cities
- A.T. Kearney: Global Cities Index 2014, Kuala Lumpur ranked 53rd out of 84 global cities
- A.T. Kearney: Global Cities Index 2015, Kuala Lumpur ranked 47th out of 125 global cities
- A.T. Kearney: Global Cities Index 2016, Kuala Lumpur ranked 49th out of 125 global cities
- A.T. Kearney: Global Cities Index 2017, Kuala Lumpur ranked 49th out of 128 global cities
- A.T. Kearney: Global Cities Index 2018, Kuala Lumpur ranked 49th out of 135 global cities
- A.T. Kearney: Global Cities Index 2019, Kuala Lumpur ranked 49th out of 130 global cities
- A.T. Kearney: Global Cities Outlook 2016, Kuala Lumpur ranked 54th out of 124 global cities
- A.T. Kearney: Global Cities Outlook 2017, Kuala Lumpur ranked 53rd out of 128 global cities
- A.T. Kearney: Global Cities Outlook 2018, Kuala Lumpur ranked 61st out of 135 global cities
- A.T. Kearney: Global Cities Outlook 2019, Kuala Lumpur ranked 76th out of 130 global cities
- Big 7 Travel: The 50 Friendliest Cities In The World 2019, Kuala Lumpur ranked 2nd in the world
- Boston Consulting Group: Cities of Choice Global City Ranking 2021, Kuala Lumpur ranked 39th out of 45 global cities
- Caterwings: Best Food Destinations 2017, George Town ranked 51st out of 100 global cities
- CBRE: Global Living Report 2019, Kuala Lumpur ranked 32nd out of 35 global cities
- Crescent Rating: Muslim Travel Shopping Index (MTSI) 2015, Kuala Lumpur and Penang ranked 2nd and 11th out of 40 global cities respectively
- Daily Mirror: World's Best City For Street Food 2019, Penang and Kuala Lumpur ranked 17th and 20th out of 30 global cities respectively
- Dell: Women Entrepreneur Cities Index 2017, Kuala Lumpur ranked 41st out of 50 global cities
- Dell: Women Entrepreneur Cities Index 2019, Kuala Lumpur ranked 44th out of 50 global cities
- Dell: Women Entrepreneur Cities Index 2023, Kuala Lumpur ranked 39th out of 55 global cities
- Cushman & Wakefield: Prepped Cities Index 2018, Kuala Lumpur ranked 8th out of 17 cities in Asia Pacific region
- EasyPark Group: Smart Cities Index 2017, Kuala Lumpur ranked 84th out of 500 global cities
- EasyPark Group: Smart Cities Index 2019, Kuala Lumpur ranked 94th out of 500 global cities
- EasyPark Group: Cities of the Future Index 2022, Kuala Lumpur ranked 50th out of 3,200 global cities for Metropolitan areas with populations over 3 million people
- ECA International: Cost of Living Survey 2016, Kuala Lumpur ranked 197th out of 262 global cities
- ECA International: Cost of Living Survey 2017, Kuala Lumpur, George Town and Johor Bahru ranked 212th, 245th and 250th out of 262 global cities respectively
- ECA International: Cost of Living Survey 2018, Kuala Lumpur ranked 182nd out of 475 global cities
- ECA International: Global Liveability Index 2015, George Town, Kuala Lumpur and Johor Bahru ranked 118th, 118th and 126th out of 269 global cities respectively
- ECA International: Global Liveability Index 2016, George Town, Kuala Lumpur and Johor Bahru ranked 117th, 120th and 127th out of 269 global cities respectively
- ECA International: Global Liveability Index 2017, George Town, Kuala Lumpur and Johor Bahru ranked 115th, 118th and 128th out of 269 global cities respectively
- ECA International: Global Liveability Index 2018, George Town and Kuala Lumpur ranked 120th and 126th out of 480 global cities respectively
- ECA International: Global Liveability Index 2019, George Town and Kuala Lumpur ranked 97th and 98th out of 480 global cities respectively
- Economist Intelligence Unit: Global Liveability Ranking 2015, Kuala Lumpur ranked 73rd out of 140 global cities
- Economist Intelligence Unit: Global Liveability Ranking 2017, Kuala Lumpur ranked 70th out of 140 global cities
- Economist Intelligence Unit: Safe Cities Index 2017, Kuala Lumpur ranked 31st out of 60 global cities
- Economist Intelligence Unit: Safe Cities Index 2019, Kuala Lumpur ranked 35th out of 60 global cities
- Economist Intelligence Unit: Safe Cities Index 2021, Kuala Lumpur ranked 32nd out of 60 global cities
- Economist Intelligence Unit: Worldwide Cost of Living Report 2015, Kuala Lumpur ranked 81st out of 133 global cities
- Economist Intelligence Unit: Worldwide Cost of Living Report 2016, Kuala Lumpur ranked 100th out of 133 global cities
- Economist Intelligence Unit: Worldwide Cost of Living Report 2017, Kuala Lumpur ranked 96th out of 133 global cities
- Economist Intelligence Unit: Worldwide Cost of Living Report 2018, Kuala Lumpur ranked 98th out of 133 global cities
- Economist Intelligence Unit: Worldwide Cost of Living Report 2019, Kuala Lumpur ranked 88th out of 133 global cities
- EF English Proficiency Index 2019, Kuala Lumpur ranked 19th out of 94 global cities
- Euromonitor International: Top 100 City Destinations Ranking WTM London 2017 Edition, Kuala Lumpur, Johor Bahru and Penang ranked 10th, 42nd and 63rd in the world
- Expatistan Cost of Living Index 2018, Kuala Lumpur and George Town ranked 258th and 304th out of 343 global cities respectively
- Expatistan Cost of Living Index 2025, Kuala Lumpur ranked 136th out of 152 global cities respectively
- Findexable: Asia Pacific Fintech Rankings 2022, Kuala Lumpur ranked 15th out of 45 Asia Pacific Fintech hubs
- Foreign Policy: The Global Cities Index 2010, Kuala Lumpur ranked 48th out of 65 global cities
- Foreign Policy: The Global Cities Index 2012, Kuala Lumpur ranked 49th out of 66 global cities
- Foreign Policy: The Global Cities Index 2014, Kuala Lumpur ranked 53rd out of 84 global cities
- Globalization and World Cities Research Network: The World According to GaWC 2016, Kuala Lumpur and Johor Bahru ranked as Alpha rank and High Sufficiency rank respectively
- GoCompare: Best Cities For Millennials To Start Businesses, Kuala Lumpur ranked 30th out of 45 global cities
- Hiyacar: World’s Most Stressful Cities To Drive In 2021, Kuala Lumpur ranked 6th out of 36 global cities
- Hoopa Top 50 Instagram Destination 2015, Kuala Lumpur ranked 29th out of 50 global cities
- Hoopa Most Liked Instagram Destinations In The World 2015, Kuala Lumpur ranked 18th out of 25 global cities
- Hoopa Top 50 Instagram Destination 2019, Kuala Lumpur ranked 39th out of 50 global cities
- IESE: Cities in Motion Index (CIMI) 2014, Kuala Lumpur ranked 56th out of 135 global cities
- IESE: Cities in Motion Index (CIMI) 2015, Kuala Lumpur ranked 88th out of 148 global cities
- IESE: Cities in Motion Index (CIMI) 2016, Kuala Lumpur ranked 88th out of 181 global cities
- IESE: Cities in Motion Index (CIMI) 2017, Kuala Lumpur ranked 92nd out of 180 global cities
- IESE: Cities in Motion Index (CIMI) 2018, Kuala Lumpur ranked 87th out of 165 global cities
- IESE: Cities in Motion Index (CIMI) 2019, Kuala Lumpur ranked 100th out of 174 global cities
- IMD: Smart City Index 2019, ranked 70th out of 102 global cities
- IMD: Smart City Index 2020, ranked 54th out of 109 global cities
- IMD: Smart City Index 2021, ranked 74th out of 118 global cities
- International Living 15 Best Islands in the World to Retire On 2021, Penang ranked 3rd in the world
- InterNations: Expat City Ranking 2017, Kuala Lumpur ranked 4th out of 51 global cities
- InterNations: Expat City Ranking 2018, Kuala Lumpur ranked 6th out of 62 global cities
- InterNations: Expat City Ranking 2019, Kuala Lumpur ranked 2nd out of 82 global cities
- InterNations: Expat City Ranking 2020, Kuala Lumpur ranked 8th out of 56 global cities
- InterNations: Expat City Ranking 2021, Kuala Lumpur ranked 1st out of 57 global cities
- InterNations: Expat City Ranking 2022, Kuala Lumpur ranked 22nd out of 50 global cities
- InterNations: Expat City Ranking 2023, Kuala Lumpur ranked 8th out of 49 global cities
- InterNations: Getting Settled Index 2020, Kuala Lumpur ranked 7th out of 66 global cities
- InterNations: Getting Settled Index 2021, Kuala Lumpur ranked 1st out of 57 global cities
- Julius Baer: Wealth Report Asia 2018, ranked 11th out of 11 Asia cities
- Knight Frank: Asia Pacific Prime Office Rental Index Q1 2017, Kuala Lumpur ranked 20th out of 20 Asian cities
- Knight Frank: Asia Pacific Prime Office Rental Index Q3 2024, Kuala Lumpur ranked 23rd out of 23 Asian cities
- Knight Frank: Global Residential Cities Index Q4 2016, Kuala Lumpur ranked 79th out of 150 global cities
- Knight Frank: Global Residential Cities Index Q4 2023, Kuala Lumpur ranked 79th out of 107 global cities
- Knight Frank: Prime International Residential Index (PIRI) 2017, Kuala Lumpur ranked 80th out of 100 global cities
- Knight Frank: Prime International Residential Index (PIRI) 2024, Kuala Lumpur ranked 78th out of 100 global cities
- Knight Frank: The Knight Frank City Wealth Index 2017, Kuala Lumpur ranked 31st out of 40 global cities
- KPMG: Leading Technology Innovation Hub 2021, Kuala Lumpur ranked 9th in ASPAC region
- Lloyd's List: Top 100 Ports 2016, Port Klang, Port Tanjung Pelepas and Penang ranked 12th, 18th and 98th in the world respectively
- Lloyd's List: Top 100 Ports 2017, Port Klang, Port Tanjung Pelepas and Penang ranked 11th, 19th and 99th in the world respectively
- Lloyd's List: Top 100 Ports 2018, Port Klang and Port Tanjung Pelepas ranked 12th and 19th in the world respectively
- Lloyd's List: Top 100 Ports 2019, Port Klang and Port Tanjung Pelepas ranked 12th and 18th in the world respectively
- Lloyd's List: Top 100 Ports 2020, Port Klang and Port Tanjung Pelepas ranked 12th and 18th in the world respectively
- Lloyd's List: Top 100 Ports 2024, Port Klang and Port Tanjung Pelepas ranked 11th and 15th in the world respectively
- Lloyd's List: Top 100 Ports 2025, Port Klang and Port Tanjung Pelepas ranked 10th and 15th in the world respectively
- Lonely Planet: Top 10 Cities list for Best in Travel 2016, George Town ranked 4th in the world
- Lyon Cab Transfer Shuttle : Taxi service transportation 2016, Kuala Lumpur ranked 2nd cheap taxi, limo service transport fares in Asia region
- MasterCard: Global Destination Cities Index 2015, Kuala Lumpur ranked 7th in the world
- MasterCard: Global Destination Cities Index 2016, Kuala Lumpur ranked 7th in the world
- MasterCard: Global Destination Cities Index 2017, Kuala Lumpur ranked 8th in the world
- MasterCard: Global Destination Cities Index 2018, Kuala Lumpur ranked 7th in the world
- MasterCard: Global Destination Cities Index 2019, Kuala Lumpur ranked 6th in the world
- Mercer: Cost of Living Rankings 2016, Kuala Lumpur ranked 151st out of 209 global cities
- Mercer: Cost of Living Rankings 2018, Kuala Lumpur ranked 145th out of 209 global cities
- Mercer: Cost of Living Rankings 2019, Kuala Lumpur ranked 141st out of 209 global cities
- Mercer: Cost of Living Rankings 2020, Kuala Lumpur ranked 144th out of 209 global cities
- Mercer: Cost of Living Rankings 2021, Kuala Lumpur ranked 152nd out of 209 global cities
- Mercer: Quality of Living Rankings 2016, Kuala Lumpur ranked 86th out of 230 global cities
- Mercer: Quality of Living Rankings 2017, Kuala Lumpur and Johor Bahru ranked 86th and 103rd out of 231 global cities respectively
- Mercer: Quality of Living Rankings 2018, Kuala Lumpur and Johor Bahru ranked 85th and 101st out of 231 global cities respectively
- Mercer: Quality of Living Rankings 2019, Kuala Lumpur and Johor Bahru ranked 85th and 101st out of 231 global cities respectively
- New Seven Wonders Foundation: New7Wonders Cities 2014, Kuala Lumpur selected as one of the New7Wonders Cities in the world
- OAG: Megahubs International Index 2018, Kuala Lumpur ranked 1st in the world for most internationally connected low-cost carrier megahub
- OAG: Megahubs International Index 2019, Kuala Lumpur ranked 12th out of 50 global cities and ranked 1st in the world for most internationally connected low-cost carrier megahub
- Open For Business City Rankings 2018, Kuala Lumpur ranked C for City is partially open for business
- Open For Business City Rankings 2020, Kuala Lumpur ranked CC for City is partially inclusive and competitive
- Open For Business City Rankings 2025, Kuala Lumpur ranked C for City is partially open for business
- PricewaterhouseCoopers: Cities of Opportunity 2014, Kuala Lumpur ranked 17th out of 30 global cities
- PricewaterhouseCoopers: Cities of Opportunity 2016, Kuala Lumpur ranked 20th out of 30 global cities
- Startup Genome: Top 100 Emerging Ecosystem Ranking - The Global Startup Ecosystem Report 2020 (GSER 2020), Kuala Lumpur ranked 11th out of 270 ecosystems from over 100 countries.
- Startup Genome: Top 100 Emerging Ecosystem Ranking - The Global Startup Ecosystem Report 2021 (GSER 2021), Kuala Lumpur ranked 21st out of 300 ecosystems from over 100 countries.
- Sustainable Destinations Top 100 2018, Taiping is ranked top 100 sustainable cities in the world
- Sustainable Destinations Top 100 2019, Taiping is ranked 3rd sustainable cities in the world
- Taxi2Airport: Cost of Public Transportation In 53 countries 2019, Kuala Lumpur ranked cheapest public transport fares in South East Asia region
- The CEO Magazine: Cities for the Best Work–Life Balance 2019, Kuala Lumpur ranked 40th out of 40 global cities
- Time: The Selfiest Cities in the World 2014, Petaling Jaya and George Town are ranked 5th and 10th out of 100 cities respectively
- Time Out: The 48 best cities in the world in 2019, Kuala Lumpur is ranked 46th out of 48 cities
- TomTom Traffic Index 2024, Georgetown, Penang, Kota Bahru, Ipoh, Johor Bahru, Kuala Lumpur, Seberang Perai, Klang & Kajang ranked 73rd, 139th, 164th, 215th, 285th, 385th, 421st & 437th out of 500 global cities
- ValueChampion: Top Millennial-Friendly Cities in Asia-Pacific, Kuala Lumpur ranked 14th out of 20 global cities
- Quacquarelli Symonds: Best Student Cities 2014, Kuala Lumpur ranked 43rd out of 50 global cities
- Quacquarelli Symonds: Best Student Cities 2016, Kuala Lumpur ranked 53rd out of 74 global cities
- Quacquarelli Symonds: Best Student Cities 2017, Kuala Lumpur ranked 41st out of 100 global cities
- Quacquarelli Symonds: Best Student Cities 2018, Kuala Lumpur ranked 37th out of 100 global cities
- Quacquarelli Symonds: Best Student Cities 2019, Kuala Lumpur ranked 29th out of 100 global cities
- Quacquarelli Symonds: Best Student Cities 2022, Kuala Lumpur ranked 31st out of 115 global cities
- Quacquarelli Symonds: Most Affordable Cities For Students 2017, Kuala Lumpur ranked 1st in the world
- Quacquarelli Symonds: Most Affordable Cities For Students 2018, Kuala Lumpur ranked 2nd in the world
- Quacquarelli Symonds: Most Affordable Cities For Students 2019, Kuala Lumpur ranked 2nd in the world
- World Shipping Council: Top 50 World Container Ports 2019, Port Klang and Port Tanjung Pelepas ranked 12th and 18th in the world respectively
- YCP Solidiance: Top E-commerce Cities in Asia 2019, Kuala Lumpur ranked 12nd in 40 Asian metropolitan cities
- YCP Solidiance: Top E-commerce Cities in Asia 2024, Kuala Lumpur ranked 6th in 40 Asian metropolitan cities

== States ==
- Condé Nast Traveler The 10 Best Places in the World to Retire 2016, Penang ranked 2nd in the world
- CNN: 17 Best Places To Visit In 2017, Penang ranked 2nd in the world
- CNN: 19 Best Spring Travel Destinations 2019, Penang ranked top 19 destinations in the world
- CNN: 17 Best Places To Visit For The Ultimate Asia Experience 2019, Penang ranked top 17 destinations in Asia
- CNN: 21 Best Destinations To Go 2022, Penang ranked top 21 destinations in the world
- Money.com : 10 Amazing Asian Vacations That Won't Cost a Fortune Penang, Malaysia, ranked #10

== Economic ==
- Asian Corporate Governance Association (ACGA): Corporate Governance (CG) Watch Report 2018, ranked 4th out of 12 Asian countries in terms of market accountability and transparency
- Basel Institute on Governance: Basel AML Index 2020, ranked 65th out of 141 countries
- Boao Forum for Asia: Asian Competitiveness Annual Report 2014, ranked 11th out of 37 countries
- Boao Forum for Asia: Asian Competitiveness Annual Report 2015, ranked 11th out of 37 countries
- Boao Forum for Asia: Asian Competitiveness Annual Report 2016, ranked 13th out of 37 countries
- Boao Forum for Asia: Asian Competitiveness Annual Report 2017, ranked 13th out of 37 countries
- Boao Forum for Asia: Asian Competitiveness Annual Report 2018, ranked 11th out of 37 countries
- Centre for Economics and Business Research (CEBR): World Economic League Table 2003, ranked 39th out of 190 countries
- Centre for Economics and Business Research (CEBR): World Economic League Table 2008, ranked 40th out of 192 countries
- Centre for Economics and Business Research (CEBR): World Economic League Table 2013, ranked 35th out of 193 countries
- Centre for Economics and Business Research (CEBR): World Economic League Table 2018, ranked 37th out of 193 countries
- Centre for Economics and Business Research (CEBR): World Economic League Table 2019, ranked 35th out of 193 countries
- Centre for Economics and Business Research (CEBR): World Economic League Table 2020, ranked 40th out of 193 countries
- Centre for Economics and Business Research (CEBR): World Economic League Table 2021, ranked 34th out of 193 countries
- Centre for Economics and Business Research (CEBR): World Economic League Table 2022, ranked 37th out of 191 countries
- CIA World Factbook: GDP - official exchange rate (2014), ranked 36th out of 218 countries
- CIA World Factbook: GDP - per capita (PPP) (2013), ranked 70th out of 181 countries
- CIA World Factbook: Budget Expenditures (2014), ranked 43rd out of 224 countries
- CIA World Factbook: Budget revenues (2014), ranked 46th out of 226 countries
- CIA World Factbook: Budget surplus (+) or deficit (-) % of GDP (2014), ranked 155th out of 213 countries
- CIA World Factbook: Current account balance (2014), ranked 19th out of 193 countries
- CIA World Factbook: Debt - external (2014), ranked 49th out of 201 countries
- CIA World Factbook: Exports (2014), ranked 25th out of 223 countries
- CIA World Factbook: Household income or consumption by percentage share - highest 10% (2014), ranked 46th out of 147 countries
- CIA World Factbook: Household income or consumption by percentage share - lowest 10% (2014), ranked 115th out of 147 countries
- CIA World Factbook: Inflation rate (consumer prices) (%) (2014), ranked 190th out of 227 countries
- CIA World Factbook: Labor force (2014), ranked 42nd out of 232 countries
- CIA World Factbook: Labor force - by occupation - agriculture (%) (2014), ranked 117th out of 197 countries
- CIA World Factbook: Labor force - by occupation - industry (%) (2014), ranked 36th out of 167 countries
- CIA World Factbook: Labor force - by occupation - services (%) (2014), ranked 106th out of 194 countries
- DHL: Global Connectedness Index 2012, ranked 16th out of 140 countries
- DHL: Global Connectedness Index 2014, ranked 21st out of 140 countries
- DHL: Global Connectedness Index 2016, ranked 19th out of 140 countries
- DHL: Global Connectedness Index 2018, ranked 12th out of 169 countries
- Findexable: Global Fintech Rankings 2021, ranked 46th out of 83 countries
- Foreign Policy: Baseline Profitability Index 2015, ranked 6th out of 110 countries
- Forbes: Best Countries for Business 2018, ranked 35th out of 153 countries
- Forbes: Best Countries for Business 2019, ranked 35th out of 161 countries
- Fraser Institute: Economic Freedom of the World 2010, ranked 70th out of 153 countries
- Fraser Institute: Economic Freedom of the World 2011, ranked 72nd out of 153 countries
- Fraser Institute: Economic Freedom of the World 2012, ranked 72nd out of 153 countries
- Fraser Institute: Economic Freedom of the World 2013, ranked 56th out of 157 countries
- Fraser Institute: Economic Freedom of the World 2014, ranked 62nd out of 159 countries
- Fraser Institute: Economic Freedom of the World 2015, ranked 65th out of 159 countries
- Global Entrepreneurship and Development Institute: Global Entrepreneurship Index 2019, ranked 58th out of 137 countries
- HelloSafe: World Prosperity Index 2024, ranked 58th out of 186 countries
- The Heritage Foundation: Index of Economic Freedom 2006^{[unfit]}, ranked 68th out of 157 countries
- The Heritage Foundation: Index of Economic Freedom 2008, ranked 51st out of 157 countries
- The Heritage Foundation: Index of Economic Freedom 2009, ranked 58th out of 179 countries
- The Heritage Foundation: Index of Economic Freedom 2010, ranked 59th out of 179 countries
- The Heritage Foundation: Index of Economic Freedom 2011, ranked 53rd out of 179 countries
- The Heritage Foundation: Index of Economic Freedom 2012, ranked 53rd out of 179 countries
- The Heritage Foundation: Index of Economic Freedom 2013, ranked 56th out of 177 countries
- The Heritage Foundation: Index of Economic Freedom 2014, ranked 37th out of 178 countries
- The Heritage Foundation: Index of Economic Freedom 2015^{[unfit]}, ranked 31st out of 178 countries
- The Heritage Foundation: Index of Economic Freedom 2016^{[unfit]}, ranked 29th out of 178 countries
- The Heritage Foundation: Index of Economic Freedom 2017^{[unfit]}, ranked 27th out of 180 countries
- The Heritage Foundation: Index of Economic Freedom 2018^{[unfit]}, ranked 22nd out of 180 countries
- Hinrich Foundation: Sustainable Trade Index 2023, ranked 14th out of 30 major global economies
- IMD: World Competitiveness Ranking 2010, ranked 10th out of 58 countries
- IMD: World Competitiveness Ranking 2016, ranked 19th out of 58 countries
- IMD: World Competitiveness Ranking 2017, ranked 24th out of 63 countries
- IMD: World Competitiveness Ranking 2018, ranked 22nd out of 63 countries
- IMD: World Competitiveness Ranking 2019, ranked 22nd out of 63 countries
- IMD: World Competitiveness Ranking 2020, ranked 27th out of 64 countries
- IMD: World Competitiveness Ranking 2021, ranked 25th out of 64 countries
- IMD: World Competitiveness Ranking 2022, ranked 32nd out of 63 countries
- IMD: World Competitiveness Ranking 2023, ranked 27th out of 64 countries
- IMD: World Digital Competitiveness Ranking 2016, ranked 24th out of 61 countries
- IMD: World Digital Competitiveness Ranking 2017, ranked 24th out of 63 countries
- IMD: World Digital Competitiveness Ranking 2018, ranked 27th out of 63 countries
- IMD: World Digital Competitiveness Ranking 2019, ranked 26th out of 63 countries
- IMD: World Digital Competitiveness Ranking 2020, ranked 26th out of 63 countries
- International Monetary Fund: GDP (nominal) per capita (2006), ranked 64th out of 182 countries
- International Monetary Fund: GDP (nominal) per capita (2009), ranked 67th out of 180 countries
- International Monetary Fund: GDP (nominal) (2006), ranked 39th out of 181 countries
- International Monetary Fund: GDP (nominal) (2006), ranked 41st out of 181 countries
- Mercator Entity Management Report 2023, ranked 1st out of 180 jurisdictions when weighting both cost and time to complete activities, which is most favorable location overall in which to base entities
- Milken Institute: Global Opportunity Index 2022, ranked 1st investment destination for foreign investors in emerging ASEAN countries
- Refinitiv: Islamic Finance Development Indicator (IFDI) 2021, ranked 1st out of 135 countries
- Standard Chartered: Wealth Expectancy Report 2019, ranked 2nd out of 10 countries in terms of smallest wealth expectancy gaps, with around two-thirds of wealth (67 per cents) creators set to achieve more than half of their wealth aspiration.
- Steve Hanke: Misery Index 2013, ranked 103rd out of 109 countries
- Steve Hanke: Misery Index 2014, ranked 101st out of 108 countries
- Steve Hanke: Misery Index 2015, ranked 52nd out of 60 countries
- Steve Hanke: Misery Index 2017, ranked 107th out of 126 countries
- Steve Hanke: Misery Index 2018, ranked 86th out of 95 countries
- The Conference Board: Consumer Confidence Index (CCI) 2018, ranked 7th in the world
- The Economist: Crony Capitalism Index 2016, ranked 2nd out of 22 countries
- The Economist: Crony Capitalism Index 2022, ranked 2nd out of 22 countries
- The Economist: Crony Capitalism Index 2023, ranked 3rd out of 43 countries
- TMF Group: Compliance Complexity Index 2018, ranked 5th in the world
- TMF Group: Global Business Complexity Index 2019, ranked 27th in the world
- World Bank: Doing Business Report 2011, ranked 21st out of 183 countries
- World Bank: Doing Business Report 2016, ranked 18th out of 190 countries
- World Bank: Doing Business Report 2017, ranked 23rd out of 190 countries
- World Bank: Doing Business Report 2018, ranked 24th out of 190 countries
- World Bank: Doing Business Report 2019, ranked 15th out of 190 countries
- World Bank: Doing Business Report 2020, ranked 12th out of 190 countries
- World Bank: LPI Global Rankings 2016, ranked 32nd out of 160 countries
- World Economic Forum: Global Competitiveness Index 2010, ranked 26th out of 139 countries
- World Economic Forum: Global Competitiveness Index 2015, ranked 18th out of 140 countries
- World Economic Forum: Global Competitiveness Index 2016, ranked 25th out of 138 countries
- World Economic Forum: Global Competitiveness Index 2017, ranked 23rd out of 137 countries
- World Economic Forum: Global Competitiveness Index 2018, ranked 25th out of 140 countries
- World Economic Forum: Global Competitiveness Index 2019, ranked 27th out of 141 countries
- World Economic Forum: Global Enabling Trade Report 2008, ranked 29th out of 118 countries
- World Economic Forum: Global Enabling Trade Report 2009, ranked 28th out of 121 countries
- World Economic Forum: Global Enabling Trade Report 2010, ranked 30th out of 125 countries
- World Economic Forum: Global Enabling Trade Report 2014, ranked 25th out of 138 countries
- World Economic Forum: Global Enabling Trade Report 2016, ranked 37th out of 136 countries

== Educational ==
- Coursera Global Skills Index (GSI) 2019, ranked 46th, 47th and 42nd out of 60 countries in Business, Technology and Data Science fields respectively
- EF English Proficiency Index 2011, ranked 9th out of 44 countries
- EF English Proficiency Index 2012, ranked 13th out of 52 countries
- EF English Proficiency Index 2013, ranked 11th out of 60 countries
- EF English Proficiency Index 2014, ranked 12th out of 63 countries
- EF English Proficiency Index 2015, ranked 14th out of 70 countries
- EF English Proficiency Index 2016, ranked 12th out of 72 countries
- EF English Proficiency Index 2017, ranked 13th out of 80 countries
- EF English Proficiency Index 2018, ranked 22nd out of 88 countries
- EF English Proficiency Index 2019, ranked 26th out of 100 countries
- EF English Proficiency Index 2020, ranked 30th out of 100 countries
- EF English Proficiency Index 2021, ranked 28th out of 112 countries
- HSBC Expat Explorer Survey 2015, ranked 20th out of 38 countries
- HSBC Expat Explorer Survey 2016, ranked 28th out of 45 countries
- HSBC Expat Explorer Survey 2017, ranked 25th out of 46 countries
- HSBC Expat Explorer Survey 2018, ranked 14th out of 29 countries
- HSBC Expat Explorer Survey 2019, ranked 16th out of 33 countries
- HSBC Expat Explorer Survey 2020, ranked 16th out of 40 countries
- IMD World Talent Report 2014, ranked 5th out of 60 countries
- IMD World Talent Ranking 2015, ranked 15th out of 61 countries
- IMD World Talent Ranking 2016, ranked 19th out of 61 countries
- IMD World Talent Ranking 2017, ranked 28th out of 63 countries
- IMD World Talent Ranking 2018, ranked 22nd out of 63 countries
- IMD World Talent Ranking 2019, ranked 22nd out of 63 countries
- IMD World Talent Ranking 2020, ranked 25th out of 63 countries
- IMD World Talent Ranking 2021, ranked 28th out of 64 countries
- IMD World Talent Ranking 2025, ranked 25th out of 69 countries
- InterNations: Expat Insider 2021, ranked 4th out of 59 countries
- INSEAD Global Talent Competitiveness Index 2013, ranked 37th out of 103 countries
- INSEAD Global Talent Competitiveness Index 2014, ranked 35th out of 93 countries
- INSEAD Global Talent Competitiveness Index 2015, ranked 30th out of 109 countries
- INSEAD Global Talent Competitiveness Index 2017, ranked 28th out of 118 countries
- INSEAD Global Talent Competitiveness Index 2018, ranked 27th out of 119 countries
- INSEAD Global Talent Competitiveness Index 2019, ranked 27th out of 125 countries
- INSEAD Global Talent Competitiveness Index 2020, ranked 26th out of 132 countries
- INSEAD Global Talent Competitiveness Index 2021, ranked 34th out of 134 countries
- MasterCard: Financial Literacy Index 2014, ranked 5th out of 16 Asia Pacific countries.
- MasterCard: Financial Literacy Index 2015, ranked 6th out of 17 Asia Pacific countries.
- OECD: Programme for International Student Assessment 2009, ranked 57th, 53rd and 55th out of 74 countries in mathematics, science and reading respectively.
- OECD: Programme for International Student Assessment 2012, ranked 52nd, 53rd and 59th out of 65 countries in mathematics, science and reading respectively.
- OECD: Programme for International Student Assessment 2015, ranked 44th, 46th and 49th out of 72 countries in mathematics, science and reading respectively.
- Universitas 21: U21 Ranking of National Higher Education Systems 2012, ranked 36th out of 50 countries
- Universitas 21: U21 Ranking of National Higher Education Systems 2014, ranked 28th out of 50 countries
- Universitas 21: U21 Ranking of National Higher Education Systems 2016, ranked 27th out of 50 countries
- Universitas 21: U21 Ranking of National Higher Education Systems 2017, ranked 25th out of 50 countries
- Universitas 21: U21 Ranking of National Higher Education Systems 2018, ranked 26th out of 50 countries
- Universitas 21: U21 Ranking of National Higher Education Systems 2019, ranked 28th out of 50 countries
- Universitas 21: U21 Ranking of National Higher Education Systems 2020, ranked 27th out of 50 countries
- Quacquarelli Symonds: Higher Education System Strength Rankings 2016, ranked 27th out of 50 countries
- Quacquarelli Symonds: Higher Education System Strength Rankings 2018, ranked 25th out of 50 countries
- Save the Children: State of the World's Mothers report 2006, ranked 52nd out of 110 countries
- UNESCO: Top 20 Countries For International Students 2014, ranked 12th in the world

== Environmental ==
- Value Champion: Asia Pacific Greenest Countries 2019, ranked 8th out of 13 Asia Pacific countries
- MIT Technology Review: The Blue Technology Barometer 2022, ranked 44th out of 66 countries
- World Economic Forum: Energy Transition Index 2023, ranked 35th out of 120 countries and 1st in South East Asia countries
- Yale University: Environmental Sustainability Index 2005, ranked 38th out of 146 countries
- Yale University: Environmental Performance Index 2006, ranked 9th out of 133 countries
- Yale University: Environmental Performance Index 2010, ranked 54th out of 163 countries
- Yale University: Environmental Performance Index 2012, ranked 25th out of 132 countries
- Yale University: Environmental Performance Index 2018, ranked 75th out of 180 countries
- Yale University: Environmental Performance Index 2022, ranked 130th out of 180 countries

== General ==
- Agility Emerging Markets Logistics Index 2016, ranked 4th out of 45 countries
- Arcadis: Global Infrastructure Investment Index (GIII) 2012, ranked 7th out of 41 countries
- Arcadis: Global Infrastructure Investment Index (GIII) 2014, ranked 7th out of 41 countries
- Arcadis: Global Infrastructure Investment Index (GIII) 2016, ranked 5th out of 41 countries
- Arcadis: International Construction Costs 2015, Malaysia ranked 38th out of 42 countries
- Arton Capital: Passport Index 2016, ranked 6th out of 98 passport power ranks
- Arton Capital: Passport Index 2017, ranked 4th out of 93 passport power ranks
- Arton Capital: Passport Index 2018, ranked 6th out of 96 passport power ranks
- Arton Capital: Passport Index 2020, ranked 8th out of 90 passport power ranks
- Arton Capital: Passport Index 2025, ranked 3rd out of 93 passport power ranks
- A.T. Kearney / Foreign Policy Magazine: Globalization Index 2006, ranked 19th out of 62 countries
- A.T. Kearney Global Services Location Index (GSLI) 2011, ranked 3rd out of 50 countries
- A.T. Kearney Global Services Location Index (GSLI) 2014, ranked 3rd out of 50 countries
- A.T. Kearney Global Services Location Index (GSLI) 2016, ranked 3rd out of 50 countries
- A.T. Kearney Global Services Location Index (GSLI) 2017, ranked 3rd out of 55 countries
- A.T. Kearney Global Services Location Index (GSLI) 2019, ranked 3rd out of 50 countries
- A.T. Kearney Global Services Location Index (GSLI) 2021, ranked 3rd out of 60 countries
- A.T. Kearney Global Services Location Index (GSLI) 2023, ranked 3rd out of 78 countries
- Bloomberg Innovation Index 2015, ranked 27th out of 50 countries
- Bloomberg Innovation Index 2019, ranked 26th out of 60 countries
- Bloomberg Innovation Index 2020, ranked 27th out of 60 countries
- Bloomberg Innovation Index 2021, ranked 29th out of 60 countries
- BookRetreats.com Global Relaxation Index 2024, ranked 20th out of 76 countries and ranked 8th globally in Best Holiday Destinations for Safety
- Credit Suisse Research Institute (CSRI): The CS Family 1000 Report 2017, ranked 7th in the world for family-owned companies
- EY Capital Confidence Barometer 2015, ranked 5th in the world for investment destinations
- EY Capital Confidence Barometer 2016, ranked 5th in the world for South East Asia region
- ETH Zurich: KOF Index of Globalisation 2012, ranked 29th out of 208 countries
- ETH Zurich: KOF Index of Globalisation 2013, ranked 27th out of 207 countries
- ETH Zurich: KOF Index of Globalisation 2014, ranked 24th out of 207 countries
- ETH Zurich: KOF Index of Globalisation 2015, ranked 26th out of 207 countries
- ETH Zurich: KOF Index of Globalisation 2016, ranked 25th out of 207 countries
- ETH Zurich: KOF Index of Globalisation 2017, ranked 31st out of 207 countries
- ETH Zurich: KOF Index of Globalisation 2018, ranked 28th out of 209 countries
- ETH Zurich: KOF Index of Globalisation 2019, ranked 26th out of 203 countries
- GoBankingRates: 50 Cheapest Countries To Retire To 2021, ranked 1st out of 50 countries
- Henley & Partners Passport Index 2013, ranked 14th out of 103 passport ranks
- Henley & Partners Passport Index 2014, ranked 8th out of 94 passport ranks
- Henley & Partners Passport Index 2015, ranked 9th out of 106 passport ranks
- Henley & Partners Passport Index 2016, ranked 12th out of 104 passport ranks
- Henley & Partners Passport Index 2017, ranked 13th out of 104 passport ranks
- Henley & Partners Passport Index 2018, ranked 10th out of 106 passport ranks
- Henley & Partners Passport Index 2019, ranked 13th out of 108 passport ranks
- Henley & Partners Passport Index 2020, ranked 13th out of 107 passport ranks
- Henley & Partners Passport Index 2021, ranked 13th out of 116 passport ranks
- Henley & Partners Passport Index 2022, ranked 12th out of 111 passport ranks
- Henley & Partners Passport Index 2025, ranked 10th out of 104 passport ranks
- INSEAD: Global Innovation Index 2007, ranked 26th out of 107 countries
- INSEAD & CII: Global Innovation Index 2008, ranked 25th out of 130 countries
- INSEAD & CII: Global Innovation Index 2009, ranked 28th out of 132 countries
- INSEAD: Global Innovation Index 2011, ranked 31st out of 125 countries
- INSEAD & WIPO: Global Innovation Index 2012, ranked 32nd out of 141 countries
- INSEAD, Cornell University & WIPO: Global Innovation Index 2013, ranked 32nd out of 142 countries
- INSEAD, Cornell University & WIPO: Global Innovation Index 2014, ranked 33rd out of 143 countries
- INSEAD, Cornell University & WIPO: Global Innovation Index 2015, ranked 32nd out of 141 countries
- INSEAD, Cornell University & WIPO: Global Innovation Index 2016, ranked 35th out of 128 countries
- INSEAD, Cornell University & WIPO: Global Innovation Index 2017, ranked 37th out of 127 countries
- INSEAD, Cornell University & WIPO: Global Innovation Index 2018, ranked 35th out of 126 countries
- INSEAD, Cornell University & WIPO: Global Innovation Index 2019, ranked 35th out of 129 countries
- INSEAD, Cornell University & WIPO: Global Innovation Index 2020, ranked 33rd out of 131 countries
- Insider Monkey: 5 Friendliest Countries in Asia 2024, ranked 2nd in Asia
- International Living The World's Best Places To Retire In 2017 / Annual Global Retirement Index 2017, ranked 6th out of 24 countries
- International Living The World's Best Places To Retire In 2018 / Annual Global Retirement Index 2018, ranked 5th out of 24 countries
- International Living The World's Best Places To Retire In 2019 / Annual Global Retirement Index 2019, ranked 5th out of 15 countries
- International Living The World's Best Places To Retire In 2022 / Annual Global Retirement Index 2022, ranked 15th out of 25 countries
- Knight Frank: Global House Price Index Q4 2016 ranked 27th out of 55 countries
- Legatum Prosperity Index 2010, ranked 43rd out of 110 countries
- Legatum Prosperity Index 2011, ranked 43rd out of 110 countries
- Legatum Prosperity Index 2012, ranked 45th out of 142 countries
- Legatum Prosperity Index 2013, ranked 44th out of 142 countries
- Legatum Prosperity Index 2014, ranked 45th out of 142 countries
- Legatum Prosperity Index 2015, ranked 44th out of 142 countries
- Legatum Prosperity Index 2016, ranked 38th out of 149 countries
- Legatum Prosperity Index 2017, ranked 42nd out of 149 countries
- Legatum Prosperity Index 2018, ranked 44th out of 149 countries
- Legatum Prosperity Index 2019, ranked 41st out of 167 countries
- LinkedIn Opportunity Index 2018, ranked 5th out of 9 countries
- LinkedIn Opportunity Index 2020, ranked 9th out of 22 countries
- MasterCard-Crescent Rating: Global Muslim Travel Index (GMTI) 2015, ranked 1st out of 100 countries
- MasterCard-Crescent Rating: Global Muslim Travel Index (GMTI) 2016, ranked 1st out of 130 countries
- MasterCard-Crescent Rating: Global Muslim Travel Index (GMTI) 2017, ranked 1st out of 130 countries
- MasterCard-Crescent Rating: Global Muslim Travel Index (GMTI) 2018, ranked 1st out of 130 countries
- MasterCard-Crescent Rating: Global Muslim Travel Index (GMTI) 2019, ranked 1st out of 129 countries
- MasterCard-Crescent Rating: Global Muslim Travel Index (GMTI) 2021, ranked 1st out of 140 countries
- MasterCard-Crescent Rating: Global Muslim Travel Index (GMTI) 2024, ranked 1st out of 145 countries
- MasterCard Index of Women Entrepreneurs (MIWE) 2017, ranked 28th out of 56 countries
- MasterCard Index of Women Entrepreneurs (MIWE) 2018, ranked 24th out of 58 countries
- MasterCard Index of Women Entrepreneurs (MIWE) 2019, ranked 21st out of 58 countries
- Newsweek World's Best Countries 2010, ranked 37th out of 100 countries
- Property Rights Alliance: International Property Rights Index 2025, ranked 41st out of 126 countries
- United Nations: Human Development Index 2006, ranked 61st out of 177 countries
- United Nations: Human Development Index 2007/2008, ranked 63rd out of 177 countries
- United Nations: Human Development Index 2009, ranked 66th out of 182 countries
- United Nations: Human Development Index 2015, ranked 62nd out of 188 countries
- United Nations: Human Development Index 2016, ranked 59th out of 188 countries
- United Nations: Human Development Index 2017, ranked 57th out of 189 countries
- United Nations: Human Development Index 2018, ranked 57th out of 189 countries
- U.S. Chamber International IP Index 2017, ranked 19th out of 45 countries
- U.S. Chamber International IP Index 2019, ranked 24th out of 50 countries
- UNWTO: Tourism Highlights 2017 Edition, ranked 11th in the world
- U.S. News & World Report Best Countries 2016, ranked 28th out of 60 countries
- U.S. News & World Report Best Countries 2017, ranked 35th out of 80 countries
- U.S. News & World Report Best Countries 2018, ranked 34th out of 80 countries
- U.S. News & World Report Best Countries 2019, ranked 38th out of 80 countries
- U.S. News & World Report Best Countries 2020, ranked 32nd out of 73 countries
- U.S. News & World Report Best Countries To Invest In 2018, ranked 4th out of 80 countries
- U.S. News & World Report Best Countries To Invest In 2019, ranked 13th out of 29 countries
- U.S. News & World Report Best Countries To Invest In 2020, ranked 12nd out of 25 countries
- World Bank: Logistics Performance Index 2023, ranked 26th out of 139 countries
- World Economic Forum Human Capital Report 2016, ranked 42nd out of 130 countries
- World Economic Forum Human Capital Report 2017, ranked 33rd out of 130 countries
- World Economic Forum Travel & Tourism Competitiveness Index 2007, ranked 31st out of 124 countries
- World Economic Forum Travel & Tourism Competitiveness Index 2008, ranked 32nd out of 130 countries
- World Economic Forum Travel & Tourism Competitiveness Index 2009, ranked 32nd out of 133 countries
- World Economic Forum Travel & Tourism Competitiveness Index 2011, ranked 35th out of 139 countries
- World Economic Forum Travel & Tourism Competitiveness Index 2013, ranked 34th out of 140 countries
- World Economic Forum Travel & Tourism Competitiveness Index 2015, ranked 25th out of 141 countries
- World Economic Forum Travel & Tourism Competitiveness Index 2017, ranked 26th out of 136 countries
- World Economic Forum Travel & Tourism Competitiveness Index 2019, ranked 29th out of 140 countries
- WIPO: Global Innovation Index 2021, ranked 36th out of 132 countries
- WIPO: Global Innovation Index 2022, ranked 36th out of 132 countries
- WIPO: Global Innovation Index 2023, ranked 36th out of 132 countries
- WIPO: Global Innovation Index 2024, ranked 33rd out of 133 countries
- WIPO: Malaysia ranking in the Global Innovation Index 2026, ranked 34th out of 139 countries

== Healthcare ==
- Bloomberg: Covid Resilience Ranking 2021, ranked 51st out of 53 countries
- Bloomberg: Health Care Efficiency Index 2017, ranked 22nd out of 55 countries
- Bloomberg: Health Care Efficiency Index 2018, ranked 29th out of 56 countries
- Economist Intelligence Unit & Johns Hopkins Center for Health Security & Nuclear Threat Initiative: Global Health Security Index 2019, ranked 18th out of 195 countries
- Economist Intelligence Unit & Johns Hopkins Center for Health Security & Nuclear Threat Initiative: Global Health Security Index 2021, ranked 27th out of 195 countries
- Indigo Wellness Index 2019, ranked 1st out of 24 countries
- International Living Global Retirement Index 2017, ranked 21st out of 151 countries
- International Living Global Retirement Index 2019, ranked 1st out of 25 countries
- LetterOne: Global Wellness Index 2019, ranked 22nd out of 150 countries
- Lowy Institute: Covid Performance Index 2021, ranked 17th out of 102 countries
- Nikkei Asia: COVID-19 Recovery Index, January 2022, ranked 13th out of 122 countries
- PEMANDU Associates: Global COVID-19 Index (GCI) 2022, ranked 13th out of 180 countries

== Military ==
- Economist Intelligence Unit: Global Peace Index 2007, ranked 37th out of 121 countries
- Institute for Economics and Peace: Global Peace Index 2010, ranked 22nd out of 149 countries
- Institute for Economics and Peace: Global Peace Index 2011, ranked 19th out of 153 countries
- Institute for Economics and Peace: Global Peace Index 2012, ranked 20th out of 158 countries
- Institute for Economics and Peace: Global Peace Index 2013, ranked 29th out of 162 countries
- Institute for Economics and Peace: Global Peace Index 2014, ranked 33rd out of 162 countries
- Institute for Economics and Peace: Global Peace Index 2015, ranked 28th out of 162 countries
- Institute for Economics and Peace: Global Peace Index 2016, ranked 30th out of 163 countries
- Institute for Economics and Peace: Global Peace Index 2017, ranked 29th out of 163 countries
- Institute for Economics and Peace: Global Peace Index 2018, ranked 25th out of 163 countries
- Institute for Economics and Peace: Global Peace Index 2019, ranked 16th out of 163 countries
- Institute for Economics and Peace: Global Peace Index 2020, ranked 20th out of 163 countries
- Institute for Economics and Peace: Global Peace Index 2021, ranked 23rd out of 163 countries
- Institute for Economics and Peace: Global Peace Index 2022, ranked 18th out of 163 countries
- Institute for Economics and Peace: Global Peace Index 2023, ranked 19th out of 163 countries
- Institute for Economics and Peace: Global Peace Index 2024, ranked 10th out of 163 countries
- Institute for Economics and Peace: Global Terrorism Index 2023, ranked 75th out of 93 ranks
- Lowy Institute: Asia Power Index 2018, ranked 9th out of 25 Asian countries
- Lowy Institute: Asia Power Index 2019, ranked 9th out of 25 Asian countries
- Lowy Institute: Asia Power Index 2020, ranked 10th out of 26 Asian countries

== Political ==
- Brand Finance: Global Soft Power Index 2025 ranked 36th out of 193 countries
- Economist Intelligence Unit: Democracy Index 2011, ranked 71st out of 167 countries
- Economist Intelligence Unit: Democracy Index 2012, ranked 64th out of 167 countries
- Economist Intelligence Unit: Democracy Index 2013, ranked 64th out of 167 countries
- Economist Intelligence Unit: Democracy Index 2014, ranked 65th out of 167 countries
- Economist Intelligence Unit: Democracy Index 2015, ranked 68th out of 167 countries
- Economist Intelligence Unit: Democracy Index 2016, ranked 65th out of 167 countries
- Economist Intelligence Unit: Democracy Index 2017, ranked 59th out of 167 countries
- Economist Intelligence Unit: Democracy Index 2018, ranked 52nd out of 167 countries
- Economist Intelligence Unit: Democracy Index 2019, ranked 43rd out of 167 countries
- Economist Intelligence Unit: Democracy Index 2020, ranked 39th out of 167 countries
- Economist Intelligence Unit: Democracy Index 2021, ranked 39th out of 167 countries
- Freedom House: Freedom in the World 2010, scored 4 "Partly Free" out of 7
- Freedom House: Freedom in the World 2011, scored 4 "Partly Free" out of 7
- Freedom House: Freedom in the World 2012, scored 4 "Partly Free" out of 7
- Freedom House: Freedom in the World 2013, scored 4 "Partly Free" out of 7
- Freedom House: Freedom in the World 2014, scored 4 "Partly Free" out of 7
- Freedom House: Freedom in the World 2015, scored 4 "Partly Free" out of 7
- Freedom House: Freedom in the World 2016, scored 4 "Partly Free" out of 7
- Freedom House: Freedom in the World 2017, scored 4 "Partly Free" out of 7
- Freedom House: Freedom in the World 2018, scored 4 "Partly Free" out of 7
- Freedom House: Freedom in the World 2019, scored 52 "Partly Free" out of 100
- Freedom House: Freedom in the World 2020, scored 52 "Partly Free" out of 100
- Freedom House: Freedom in the World 2021, scored 51 "Partly Free" out of 100
- Freedom House: Freedom in the World 2022, scored 50 "Partly Free" out of 100
- Freedom House: Freedom in the World 2023, scored 53 "Partly Free" out of 100
- Gallup: Global Law and Order 2019, ranked 18th out of 42 score ranking
- Gallup: Global Law and Order 2020, ranked 13th out of 41 score ranking
- Reporters Without Borders: World Press Freedom Index 2010, ranked 141st out of 178 countries
- Reporters Without Borders: World Press Freedom Index 2014, ranked 147th out of 180 countries
- Reporters Without Borders: World Press Freedom Index 2015, ranked 147th out of 180 countries
- Reporters Without Borders: World Press Freedom Index 2016, ranked 146th out of 180 countries
- Reporters Without Borders: World Press Freedom Index 2017, ranked 144th out of 180 countries
- Reporters Without Borders: World Press Freedom Index 2018, ranked 145th out of 180 countries
- Reporters Without Borders: World Press Freedom Index 2019, ranked 123rd out of 180 countries
- Reporters Without Borders: World Press Freedom Index 2020, ranked 101st out of 180 countries
- Reporters Without Borders: World Press Freedom Index 2021, ranked 119th out of 180 countries
- Reporters Without Borders: World Press Freedom Index 2022, ranked 113th out of 180 countries
- Reporters Without Borders: World Press Freedom Index 2023, ranked 73rd out of 180 countries
- TRACE Bribery Risk Matrix 2014 ranked 62nd out of 197 countries
- TRACE Bribery Risk Matrix 2016 ranked 47th out of 199 countries
- TRACE Bribery Risk Matrix 2017 ranked 79th out of 200 countries
- TRACE Bribery Risk Matrix 2018 ranked 63rd out of 200 countries
- TRACE Bribery Risk Matrix 2019 ranked 58th out of 200 countries
- TRACE Bribery Risk Matrix 2020 ranked 51st out of 194 countries
- TRACE Bribery Risk Matrix 2021 ranked 65th out of 194 countries
- Transparency International: Corruption Perceptions Index 2006 ranked 43rd out of 163 countries
- Transparency International: Corruption Perceptions Index 2007 ranked 43rd out of 179 countries
- Transparency International: Corruption Perceptions Index 2008 ranked 47th out of 180 countries
- Transparency International: Corruption Perceptions Index 2009 ranked 56th out of 180 countries
- Transparency International: Corruption Perceptions Index 2010 ranked 56th out of 178 countries
- Transparency International: Corruption Perceptions Index 2011 ranked 60th out of 182 countries
- Transparency International: Corruption Perceptions Index 2012 ranked 54th out of 174 countries
- Transparency International: Corruption Perceptions Index 2013 ranked 53rd out of 175 countries
- Transparency International: Corruption Perceptions Index 2014 ranked 50th out of 174 countries
- Transparency International: Corruption Perceptions Index 2015 ranked 54th out of 167 countries
- Transparency International: Corruption Perceptions Index 2016 ranked 55th out of 176 countries
- Transparency International: Corruption Perceptions Index 2017 ranked 62nd out of 180 countries
- Transparency International: Corruption Perceptions Index 2018 ranked 61st out of 180 countries
- Transparency International: Corruption Perceptions Index 2019 ranked 51st out of 180 countries
- Transparency International: Corruption Perceptions Index 2020 ranked 57th out of 180 countries
- Transparency International: Corruption Perceptions Index 2021 ranked 62nd out of 180 countries
- World Justice Project: Rule of Law Index 2016, ranked 56th out of 113 countries
- World Justice Project: Rule of Law Index 2017, ranked 53rd out of 113 countries
- World Justice Project: Rule of Law Index 2019, ranked 51st out of 126 countries
- World Justice Project: Rule of Law Index 2020, ranked 47th out of 128 countries
- World Justice Project: Rule of Law Index 2021, ranked 54th out of 139 countries

== Social ==
- Big Travel: Top 50 Sexiest Accents In The World 2019, ranked 39th in the world
- Big Travel: The 50 Sexiest Nationalities In The World 2019, ranked 25th in the world
- Economist Intelligence Unit: Quality-of-life index 2005, ranked 36th out of 108 countries
- Economist Intelligence Unit: Where-to-be-born Index 1988, ranked 37th out of 80 countries
- Economist Intelligence Unit: Where-to-be-born Index 2013, ranked 36th out of 80 countries
- Expedia: 17th Annual Survey on Vacation Deprivation 2017, ranked 3rd out of 30 countries
- Gallup: Potential Net Migration Index 2014, ranked 4th out of 28 Asian countries
- Ipsos: Index of Ignorance 2016, ranked 36th out of 40 countries
- Ipsos: Misperceptions Index 2017, ranked 15th out of 38 countries
- Ipsos: Misperceptions Index 2018, ranked 4th out of 37 countries
- Mercer: Melbourne Mercer Global Pension Index 2018, ranked C rating with an overall score of 58.5
- Mercer: Melbourne Mercer Global Pension Index 2019, ranked C+ rating with an overall score of 60.6
- Mercer: Melbourne Mercer Global Pension Index 2020, ranked C+ rating with an overall score of 60.1
- Mercer: Melbourne Mercer Global Pension Index 2021, ranked 23rd in the world with an overall score of 59.6
- Nature: Where People Walk The Most 2017, ranked 44th out of 46 countries
- Social Progress Imperative: Social Progress Index 2014, ranked 45th out of 132 countries
- Social Progress Imperative: Social Progress Index 2015, ranked 46th out of 133 countries
- Social Progress Imperative: Social Progress Index 2016, ranked 50th out of 133 countries
- Social Progress Imperative: Social Progress Index 2017, ranked 50th out of 128 countries
- The Economist: Global Normalcy Index 2021, ranked 50th out of 50 countries
- Sustainable Development Solutions Network's World Happiness Report 2013, ranked 56th out of 156 countries
- United Nations Sustainable Development Solutions Network's World Happiness Report 2015, ranked 61st out of 158 countries
- United Nations Sustainable Development Solutions Network's World Happiness Report 2016, ranked 47th out of 157 countries
- United Nations Sustainable Development Solutions Network's World Happiness Report 2017, ranked 42nd out of 155 countries
- United Nations Sustainable Development Solutions Network's World Happiness Report 2018, ranked 35th out of 156 countries
- United Nations Sustainable Development Solutions Network's World Happiness Report 2019, ranked 80th out of 156 countries
- United Nations Sustainable Development Solutions Network's World Happiness Report 2020, ranked 82nd out of 153 countries
- U.S. News & World Report: Best Heritage Country 2020, ranked 32nd out of 73 countries
- U.S. News & World Report: Best Heritage Country 2021, ranked 34th out of 78 countries
- World Economic Forum: Global Social Mobility Index 2020, ranked 43rd out of 82 countries

== Demographics ==
- Birth rate 2011: ranked 82nd out of 221 countries
- Birth rate 2016: ranked 85th out of 226 countries
- Birth rate 2017: ranked 85th out of 226 countries
- Death rate 2011: ranked 186th out of 223 countries
- Death rate 2016: ranked 186th out of 226 countries
- Death rate 2017: ranked 192nd out of 226 countries
- Fertility rate 2011: ranked 76th out of 222 countries
- Fertility rate 2016: ranked 77th out of 224 countries
- Fertility rate 2017: ranked 80th out of 224 countries
- Life expectancy 2011: ranked 111th out of 221 countries
- Life expectancy 2016: ranked 110th out of 224 countries
- Life expectancy 2017: ranked 109th out of 224 countries

== Technological ==
- Anthropic Economic Index 2025, ranked 64th out of 115 countries
- Center for Long-term Artificial Intelligence (CLAI), International Research Center for AI Ethics and Governance & Institute of Automation, Chinese Academy of Sciences Global Index for AI Safety (GIAIS) Feb 2025, ranked 22nd out of 40 countries
- Consumer Technology Association (CTA) Global Innovation Scorecard 2025, ranked as Innovation Leaders
- Economist Intelligence Unit: E-readiness 2007, ranked 43rd out of 69 countries
- Economist Intelligence Unit: E-readiness 2008, ranked 34th out of 70 countries
- Economist Intelligence Unit: E-readiness 2009, ranked 38th out of 70 countries
- Economist Intelligence Unit: E-readiness 2010, ranked 36th out of 70 countries
- Economist Intelligence Unit: Government E-Payments Adoption 2011, ranked 29th out of 62 countries
- Economist Intelligence Unit: Government E-Payments Adoption 2018, ranked 19th out of 73 countries
- Huawei: Global Connectivity Index (GCI) 2015, ranked 29th out of 50 countries
- Huawei: Global Connectivity Index (GCI) 2016, ranked 25th out of 50 countries
- Huawei: Global Connectivity Index (GCI) 2017, ranked 24th out of 50 countries
- Huawei: Global Connectivity Index (GCI) 2019, ranked 30th out of 79 countries
- Huawei: Global Connectivity Index (GCI) 2020, ranked 34th out of 79 countries
- International Telecommunication Union: Global Cybersecurity Index (GCI) 2014, ranked 3rd out of 29 overall index scores
- International Telecommunication Union: Global Cybersecurity Index (GCI) 2015, ranked 3rd out of 29 overall index scores
- International Telecommunication Union: Global Cybersecurity Index (GCI) 2017, ranked 3rd out of 165 countries
- International Telecommunication Union: Global Cybersecurity Index (GCI) 2018, ranked 8th out of 175 countries
- International Telecommunication Union: Global Cybersecurity Index (GCI) 2020, ranked 5th out of 194 countries
- International Telecommunication Union (ITU): ICT Development Index 2010, ranked 61st out of 166 countries
- International Telecommunication Union (ITU): ICT Development Index 2015, ranked 64th out of 167 countries
- International Telecommunication Union (ITU): ICT Development Index 2016, ranked 62nd out of 175 countries
- International Telecommunication Union (ITU): ICT Development Index 2017, ranked 63rd out of 176 countries
- International Telecommunication Union (ITU): ICT Development Index 2023, ranked 15th out of 169 countries
- MasterCard & Tufts University: Digital Intelligence Index 2020, ranked as Stand Out Nation that digitally advanced and exhibiting high momentum, leaders in driving innovation and building on existing advantages
- NationMaster: Technological Achievement 2001, ranked 28th out of 68 countries
- Open Knowledge Foundation: Global Open Data Index (GODI) 2018, ranked 87th out of 94 countries
- Open Data Watch: Open Data Inventory (ODIN) 2024, ranked 1st out of 197 countries
- Opensignal: The State of Mobile Games Experience in the 5G Era 2020, ranked 50th out of 100 countries
- Oxford Insights: Government Artificial Intelligence Readiness Index 2019, ranked 22nd out of 194 countries
- Oxford Insights: Government Artificial Intelligence Readiness Index 2023, ranked 23rd out of 193 countries
- RankingRoyals: Best Digital Infrastructure 2024, ranked 31st out of 40 countries
- ScienceDirect: Global Smartphone Addiction Research, ranked 3rd out of 24 countries
- Speedtest Global Index 2018: Fixed Broadband, ranked 29th out of 130 countries
- Speedtest Global Index 2020: Fixed Broadband, ranked 36th out of 176 countries
- Speedtest Global Index 2018: Mobile, ranked 75th out of 124 countries
- Speedtest Global Index 2020: Mobile, ranked 86th out of 141 countries
- Stanford University: Global AI Vibrancy Ranking 2017, ranked 7th out of 36 countries
- Stanford University: Global AI Vibrancy Ranking 2018, ranked 10th out of 36 countries
- Stanford University: Global AI Vibrancy Ranking 2019, ranked 16th out of 36 countries
- Stanford University: Global AI Vibrancy Ranking 2020, ranked 26th out of 36 countries
- Stanford University: Global AI Vibrancy Ranking 2021, ranked 14th out of 36 countries
- Stanford University: Global AI Vibrancy Ranking 2022, ranked 13th out of 36 countries
- Stanford University: Global AI Vibrancy Ranking 2023, ranked 26th out of 36 countries
- Surfshark: Digital Quality of Life (DQL) Index 2021, ranked 31st out of 110 countries
- Surfshark: Digital Quality of Life (DQL) Index 2022, ranked 38th out of 117 countries
- Surfshark: Digital Quality of Life (DQL) Index 2023, ranked 37th out of 121 countries
- Tortoise Media: Global AI Index 2019, ranked 40th out of 54 countries
- Tortoise Media: Global AI Index 2021, ranked 43rd out of 62 countries
- Tortoise Media: Global AI Index 2023, ranked 44th out of 62 countries
- Truecaller Global Spam Report 2021, ranked 32nd in the world
- UN: E-Participation Index 2003, ranked 67th out of 151 countries
- UN: E-Participation Index 2004, ranked 62nd out of 151 countries
- UN: E-Participation Index 2005, ranked 52nd out of 151 countries
- UN: E-Participation Index 2008, ranked 41st out of 170 countries
- UN: E-Participation Index 2010, ranked 12nd out of 180 countries
- UN: E-Participation Index 2012, ranked 31st out of 161 countries
- UN: E-Participation Index 2014, ranked 59th out of 192 countries
- UN: E-Participation Index 2016, ranked 47th out of 191 countries
- UN: E-Participation Index 2018, ranked 32nd out of 193 countries
- UN: E-Participation Index 2020, ranked 29th out of 193 countries
- UN: E-Government Development Index (EDGI) 2003, ranked 43rd out of 174 countries
- UN: E-Government Development Index (EDGI) 2004, ranked 42nd out of 179 countries
- UN: E-Government Development Index (EDGI) 2005, ranked 43rd out of 180 countries
- UN: E-Government Development Index (EDGI) 2008, ranked 34th out of 183 countries
- UN: E-Government Development Index (EDGI) 2010, ranked 32nd out of 184 countries
- UN: E-Government Development Index (EDGI) 2012, ranked 40th out of 191 countries
- UN: E-Government Development Index (EDGI) 2014, ranked 52nd out of 193 countries
- UN: E-Government Development Index (EDGI) 2016, ranked 60th out of 193 countries
- UN: E-Government Development Index (EDGI) 2018, ranked 48th out of 193 countries
- UN: E-Government Development Index (EDGI) 2020, ranked 47th out of 193 countries
- UN: E-Government Development Index (EDGI) 2024, ranked 57th out of 193 countries
- UNCTAD: B2C E-Commerce Index 2016, ranked 44th out of 137 countries
- UNCTAD: B2C E-Commerce Index 2017, ranked 38th out of 144 countries
- UNCTAD: B2C E-Commerce Index 2018, ranked 34th out of 151 countries
- UNCTAD: B2C E-Commerce Index 2019, ranked 34th out of 152 countries
- UNCTAD: Technology and Innovation Report Readiness For Frontier Technologies Index 2021, ranked 31st out of 158 countries
- World Economic Forum: Global Information Technology Report The Networked Readiness Index 2016, ranked 31st out of 139 countries

== See also ==
- Lists of countries
- Lists by country
- List of international rankings
- International rankings of Penang
