= List of globalization-related indices =

This article lists various economic and human development measurements related to the study of globalization.

- The Atlas of Economic Complexity
- Big Mac Index
- Brandt Report
- Corruption Perceptions Index
- Democracy Index
- Democracy-Dictatorship Index
- Ease of doing business index
- Economic Freedom of the World
- Economic Vulnerability Index
- Energy Globalization Index
- Environmental Performance Index
- Environmental Vulnerability Index
- Freedom in the World
- Gini coefficient
- Global city
- Global Competitiveness Report
- Global Connectedness Index
- Global Enabling Trade Report
- Global Entrepreneurship Index
- Global Food Security Index
- Global Gender Gap Report
- Global Hunger Index
- Global Innovation Index
- Global Liveability Ranking
- Global Peace Index
- Global Slavery Index
- Global Terrorism Index
- Global Web Index
- Good Country Index
- Government competitiveness
- Happy Planet Index
- Human Development Index
- Human Poverty Index
- Index of Economic Freedom
- KOF Index of Globalisation
- Linguistic Diversity Index
- Maastricht Globalization Index
- Networked Readiness Index
- OECD Better Life Index
- Press Freedom Index
- Small Arms Survey
- Social Progress Index
- Trade-to-GDP ratio
- Transnationality Index
- World Competitiveness Yearbook
- World Intellectual Property Indicators
- World Giving Index
- World Governance Index
- World Happiness Report
- Where-to-be-born Index
- World Tourism rankings
- Worldwide Governance Indicators

== See also ==
- List of international rankings
