= International rankings of Brunei =

These are the international rankings of Brunei

== International rankings ==
GDP per capita – 5th highest, at I$50,117
Human Development Index – 30th high, at 0.919
Literacy Rate – 75th, at 92.7%
Unemployment rate – 158th, at 4.00%
World Intellectual Property Organization: Global Innovation Index 2026, ranked 98 out of 139 countries

Health rankings
Fertility rate- 105th most fertile, at 2.29 per woman

Birth rate – 87th most births, at 21.58 per 1000 people

Infant mortality – 30th least deaths, at 5.5 per 1000 live births

Death rate – 191st highest death rate, at 2.8 per 1000 people
Life Expectancy – 43rd highest, at 77.1 years
HIV/AIDS rate – 123rd most cases, at 1000 people
