= List of most expensive cities for expatriate employees =

These are lists of the world's most expensive cities for expatriate employees (not residents), according to the Mercer, ECA International and Xpatulator.com cost-of-living surveys. Other surveys from online collaborative indices, such as Numbeo, Expatistan, or Eardex are not covered by this article.

Various factors enter into a city's cost-of-living for expatriate employees, such as monetary value, consumer confidence, investment, interest rates, exchange rates of the country's currency, and housing costs. This list does not account for cost-of-living savings accrued to local citizens through government-subsidized housing, health care, education, differences in taxation, and many other factors irrelevant to expatriates. Cost of living may be much higher for expatriates than for local residents in a developing country, especially if expatriates expect a standard of living similar to a developed country.

== Mercer ==
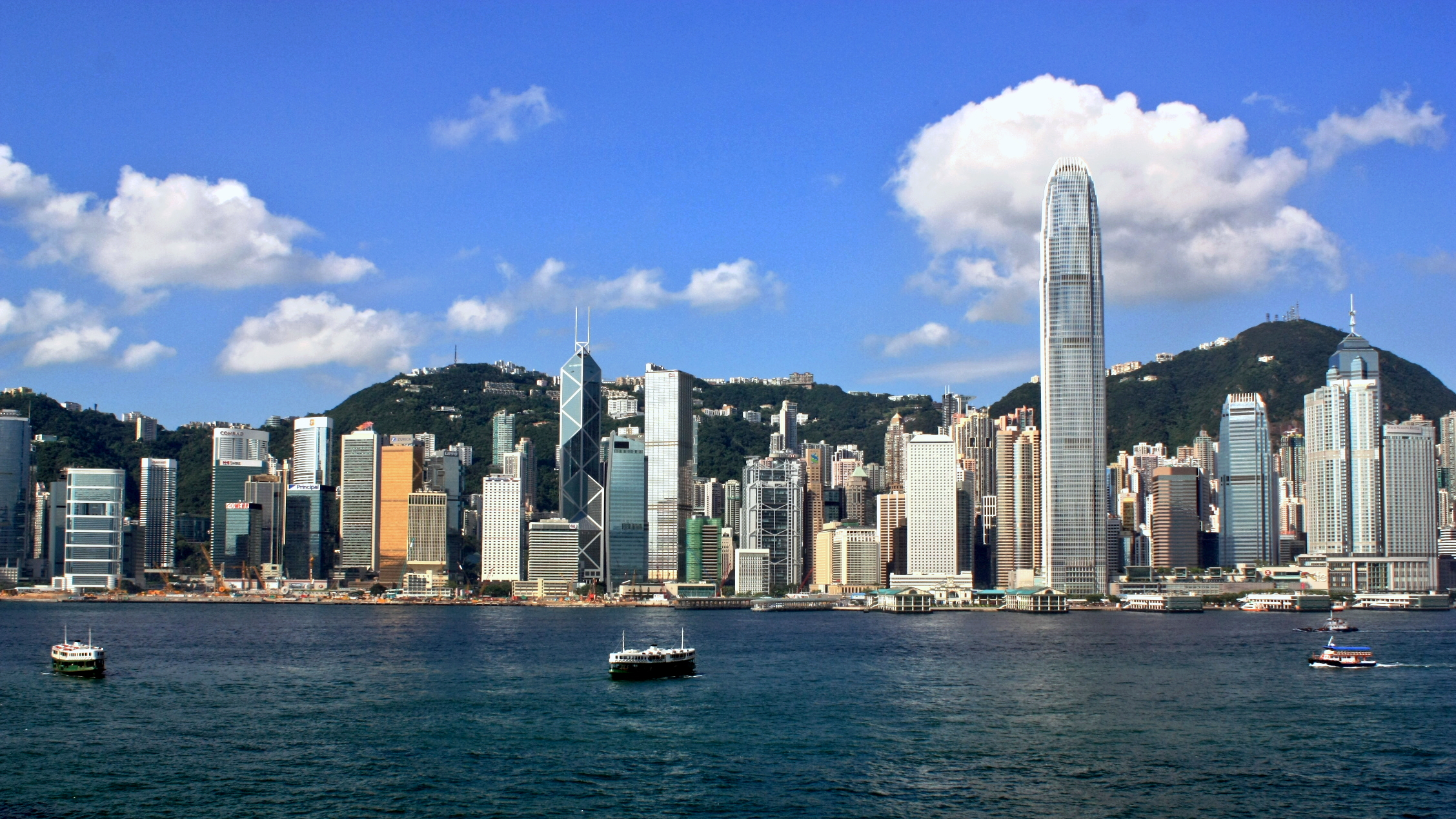
Hong Kong

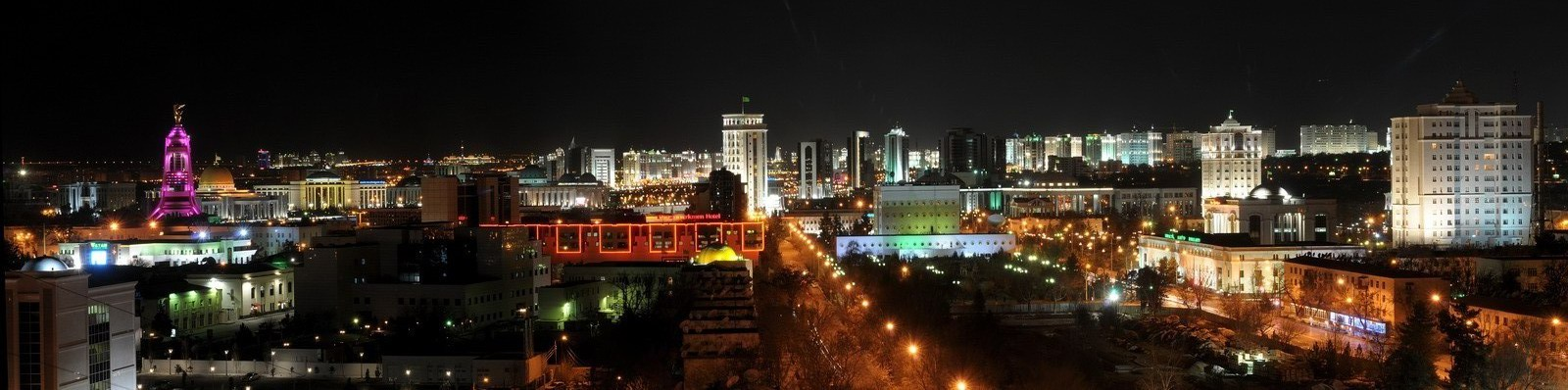
Ashgabat, Turkmenistan

Tokyo, Japan

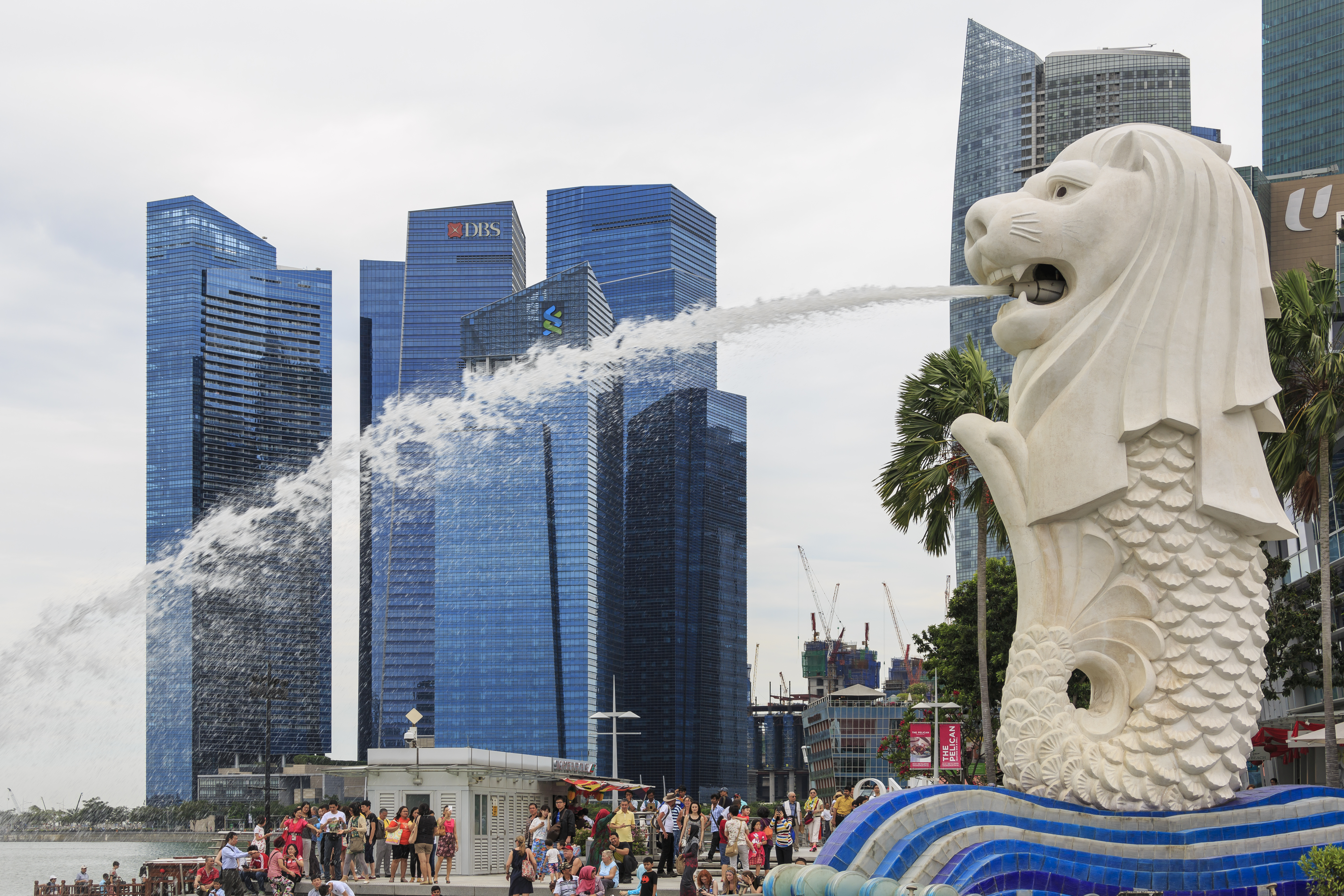
Singapore

Mercer's Cost of Living surveys are taken in March of each year. The survey covers 207 cities around the world and measures the comparative cost of over 200 items in each location, including housing, transport, food, clothing, household goods, and entertainment. It is designed to help multinational companies and governments determine compensation allowances for their expatriate employees. New York is used as the base city, and all other cities are compared against it. The cost of housing plays an important part in determining where cities are ranked.

Two main factors determine a city's ranking in Mercer's survey – the relative strength of the relevant currency against the US dollar over the prior 12 months and price movements over the prior 12 months compared to those in New York City as the base.

Top ten locations surveyed (2024)
Rank	City	Country or Region
1	Hong Kong	Hong Kong
2	Singapore	Singapore
3	Zürich	Switzerland
4	Geneva	Switzerland
5	Basel	Switzerland
6	Bern	Switzerland
7	New York	United States
8	London	United Kingdom
9	Nassau	Bahamas
10	Los Angeles	United States

Top ten locations surveyed (2023)
Rank	City	Country or Region
1	Hong Kong	Hong Kong
2	Singapore	Singapore
3	Zürich	Switzerland
4	Geneva	Switzerland
5	Basel	Switzerland
6	New York	United States
7	Bern	Switzerland
8	Tel Aviv	Israel
9	Copenhagen	Denmark
10	Nassau	Bahamas

Top ten locations surveyed (2022)
Rank	City	Country or Region
1	Hong Kong	Hong Kong
2	Zürich	Switzerland
3	Geneva	Switzerland
4	Basel	Switzerland
5	Bern	Switzerland
6	Tel Aviv	Israel
7	New York	United States
8	Singapore	Singapore
9	Tokyo	Japan
10	Beijing	China

Top ten locations surveyed (2021)
Rank	City	Country or Region
1	Ashgabat	Turkmenistan
2	Hong Kong	Hong Kong
3	Beirut	Lebanon
4	Tokyo	Japan
5	Zürich	Switzerland
6	Shanghai	China
7	Singapore	Singapore
8	Geneva	Switzerland
9	Beijing	China
10	Bern	Switzerland

Top ten locations surveyed (2020)
Rank	City	Country of Region
1	Hong Kong	Hong Kong
2	Ashgabat	Turkmenistan
3	Tokyo	Japan
4	Zürich	Switzerland
5	Singapore	Singapore
6	New York	United States
7	Shanghai	China
8	Bern	Switzerland
9	Geneva	Switzerland
10	Beijing	China

Top ten locations surveyed (2019)
Rank	City	Country or Region
1	Hong Kong	Hong Kong
2	Tokyo	Japan
3	Singapore	Singapore
4	Seoul	South Korea
5	Zürich	Switzerland
6	Shanghai	China
7	Ashgabat	Turkmenistan
8	Beijing	China
9	New York	United States
10	Shenzhen	China

Top ten locations surveyed (2018)
Rank	City	Country or Region
1	Hong Kong	Hong Kong
2	Tokyo	Japan
3	Zürich	Switzerland
4	Singapore	Singapore
5	Seoul	South Korea
6	Luanda	Angola
7	Shanghai	China
8	N'Djamena	Chad
9	Beijing	China
10	Bern	Switzerland

Top ten locations surveyed (2017)
Rank	City	Country or Region
1	Luanda	Angola
2	Hong Kong	Hong Kong
3	Tokyo	Japan
4	Zürich	Switzerland
5	Singapore	Singapore
6	Seoul	South Korea
7	Geneva	Switzerland
8	Shanghai	China
9	New York	United States
10	Bern	Switzerland

Top ten locations surveyed (2016)
Rank	City	Country or Region
1	Hong Kong	Hong Kong
2	Luanda	Angola
3	Zürich	Switzerland
4	Singapore	Singapore
5	Tokyo	Japan
6	Kinshasa	Democratic Republic of the Congo
7	Shanghai	China
8	Geneva	Switzerland
9	N'Djamena	Chad
10	Beijing	China

Top ten locations surveyed (2015)
Rank	City	Country or Region
1	Luanda	Angola
2	Hong Kong	Hong Kong
3	Zürich	Switzerland
4	Singapore	Singapore
5	Geneva	Switzerland
6	Shanghai	China
7	Beijing	China
8	Seoul	South Korea
9	Bern	Switzerland
10	N'Djamena	Chad

== ECA International ==
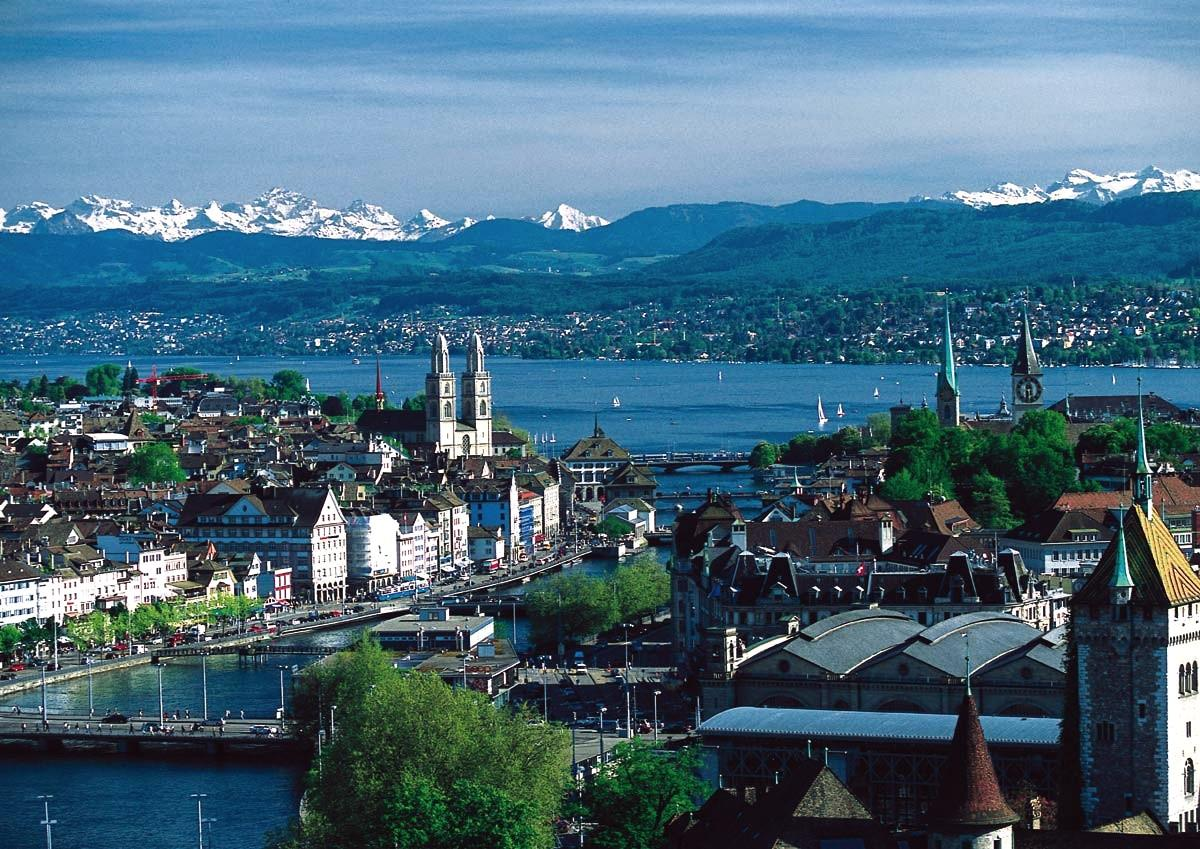
Zürich, Switzerland

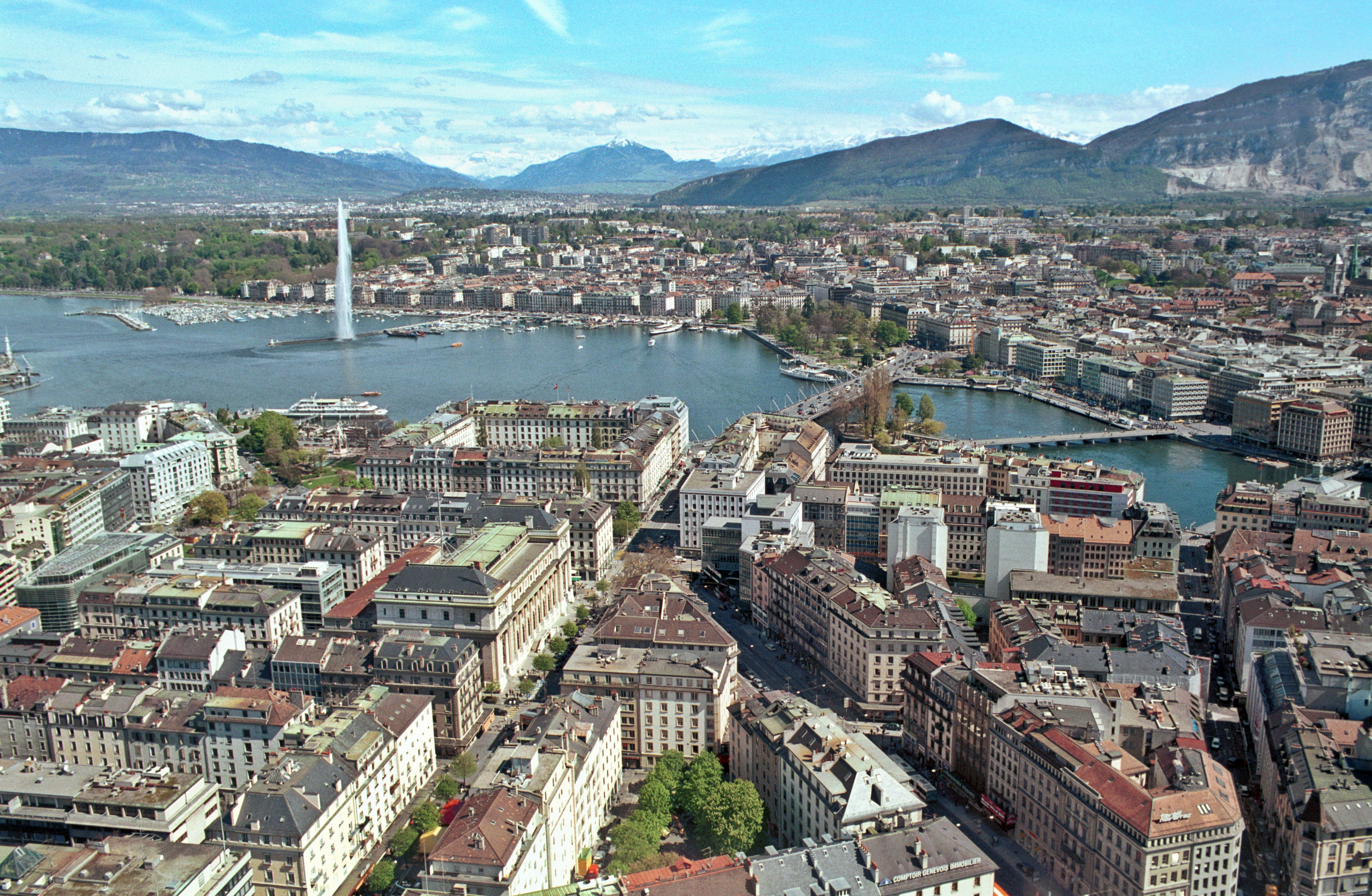
Geneva, Switzerland

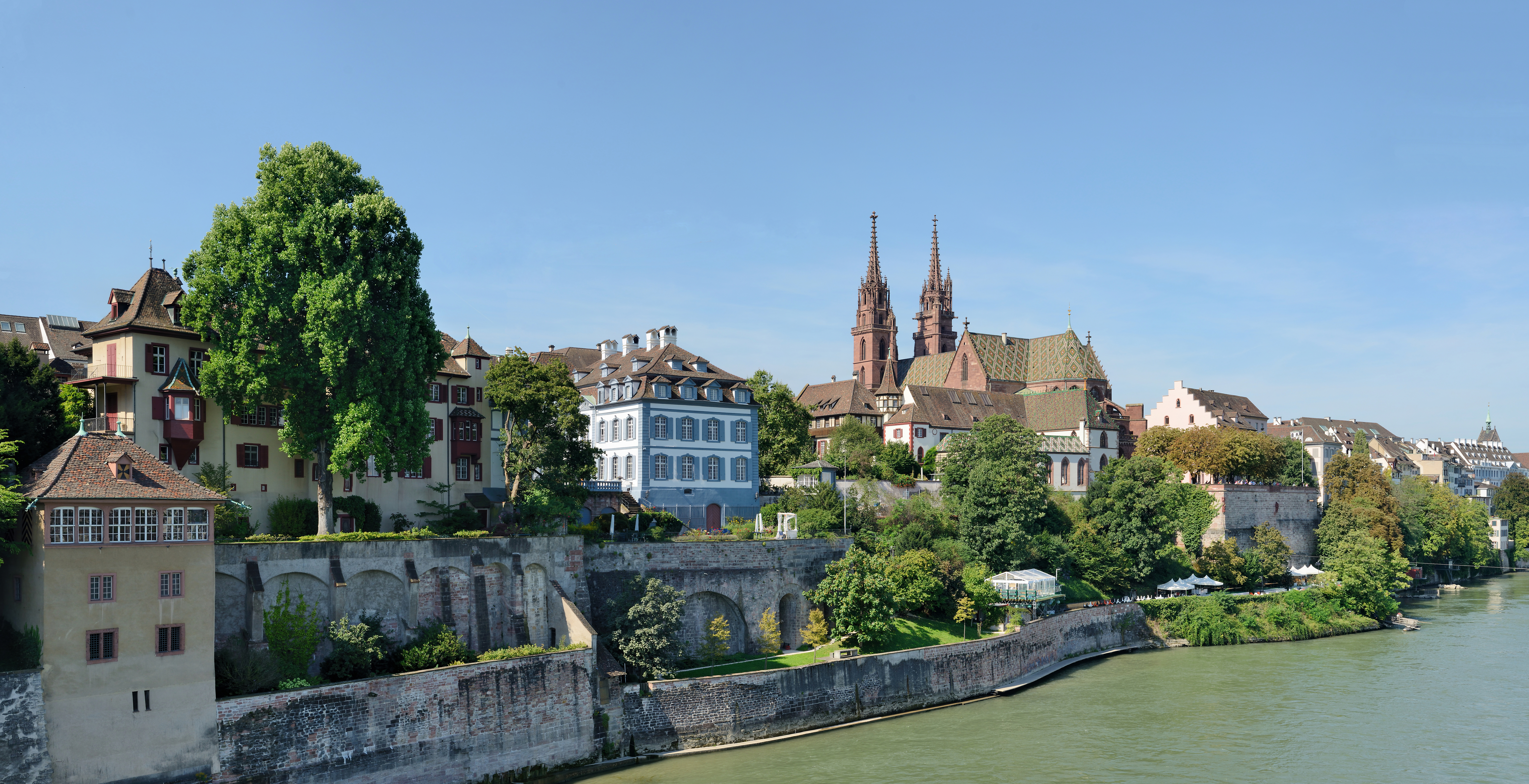
Basel, Switzerland

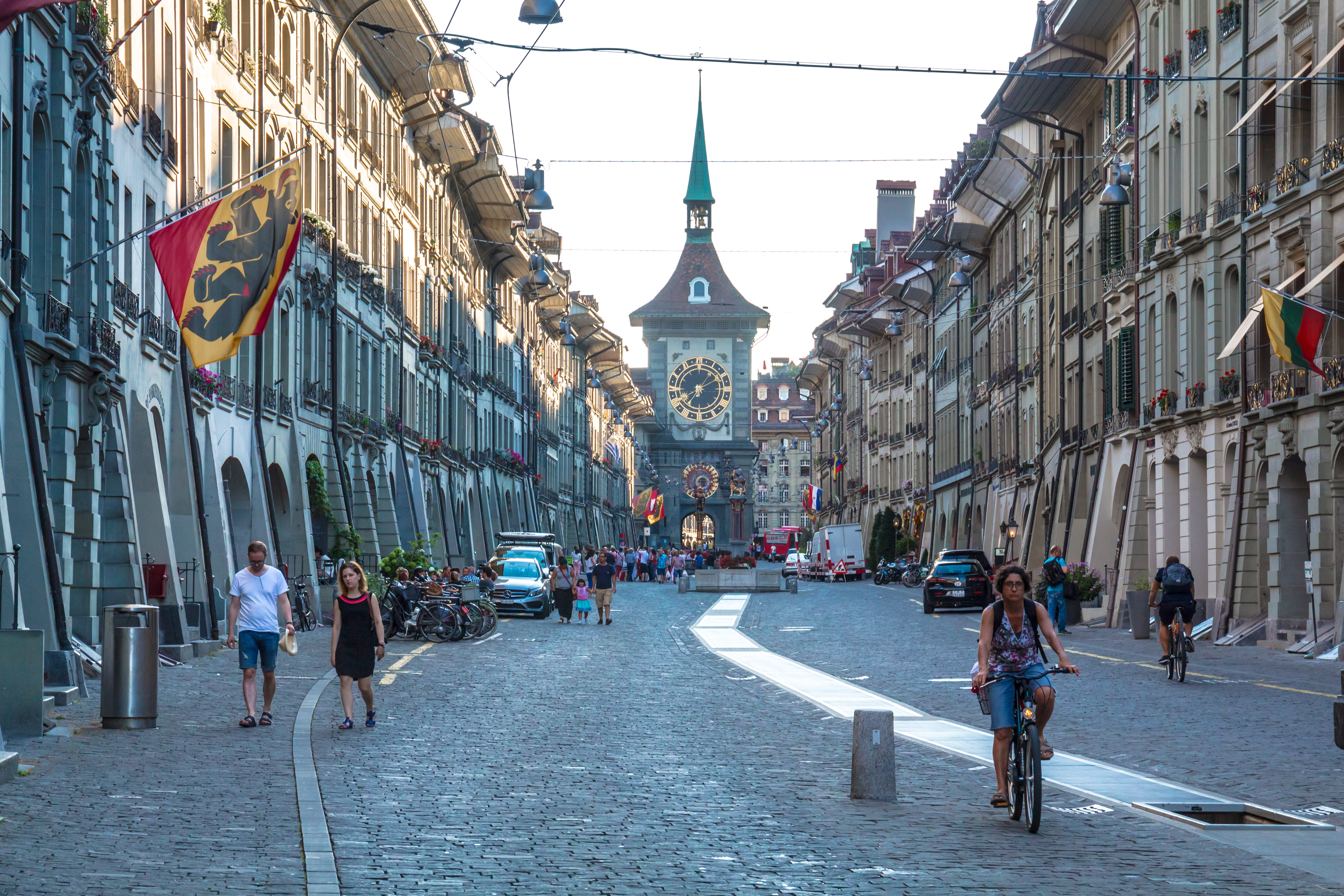
Bern, Switzerland

Every March and September, ECA International calculates the cost of living for expatriates in almost 400 cities around the world. The survey does not include certain living costs such as accommodation, utilities (electricity, gas, water costs), car purchase and school fees. These are usually compensated for separately in expatriate packages from cost of living allowances.

Top 20 cities surveyed (2023)
Ranking	City	Country or Region
1	New York	United States
2	Hong Kong	Hong Kong
3	Geneva	Switzerland
4	London	United Kingdom
5	Singapore	Singapore
6	Zürich	Switzerland
7	San Francisco	United States
8	Tel Aviv	Israel
9	Seoul	South Korea
10	Tokyo	Japan

Top 20 cities surveyed (2022)
Ranking	City	Country or Region
1	Hong Kong	Hong Kong
2	New York	United States
3	Geneva	Switzerland
4	London	United Kingdom
5	Tokyo	Japan
6	Tel Aviv	Israel
7	Zürich	Switzerland
8	Shanghai	China
9	Guangzhou	China
10	Seoul	South Korea

Top 20 cities surveyed (2021)
Ranking	City	Country or Region
1	Hong Kong	Hong Kong
2	Tokyo	Japan
3	Geneva	Switzerland
4	New York	United States
5	London	United Kingdom
6	Zürich	Switzerland
7	Tel Aviv	Israel
8	Seoul	South Korea
9	Shanghai	China
10	Guangzhou	China

Top 20 cities surveyed (2020)
Ranking	City	Country or Region
1	Ashgabat	Turkmenistan
2	Zürich	Switzerland
3	Geneva	Switzerland
4	Basel	Switzerland
5	Bern	Switzerland
6	Hong Kong	Hong Kong
7	Tokyo	Japan
8	Tel Aviv	Israel
9	Jerusalem	Israel
10	Yokohama	Japan

Top 20 cities surveyed (2019)
Ranking	City	Country or Region
1	Ashgabat	Turkmenistan
2	Zürich	Switzerland
3	Geneva	Switzerland
4	Hong Kong	Hong Kong
5	Basel	Switzerland
6	Bern	Switzerland
7	Tokyo	Japan
8	Seoul	South Korea
9	Tel Aviv	Israel
10	Shanghai	China

Top 20 cities surveyed (2018)
Ranking	City	Country or Region
1	Ashgabat	Turkmenistan
2	Geneva	Switzerland
3	Zürich	Switzerland
4	Basel	Switzerland
5	Bern	Switzerland
6	Hong Kong	Hong Kong
7	Seoul	South Korea
8	Tokyo	Japan
9	Oslo	Norway
10	Stavanger	Norway

Top 20 cities surveyed (2017)
Ranking	City	Country or Region
1	Luanda	Angola
2	Hong Kong	Hong Kong
3	Zürich	Switzerland
4	Geneva	Switzerland
5	Basel	Switzerland
6	Bern	Switzerland
7	Tokyo	Japan
8	Seoul	South Korea
9	Caracas	Venezuela
10	Khartoum	Sudan

Top 20 cities surveyed (2016)
Ranking	City	Country or Region
1	Kinshasa	Democratic Republic of the Congo
2	Zürich	Switzerland
3	Geneva	Switzerland
4	Basel	Switzerland
5	Bern	Switzerland
6	Freetown	Sierra Leone
7	Tokyo	Japan
8	Luanda	Angola
9	Hong Kong	Hong Kong
10	Shanghai	China

Top 20 cities surveyed (2015)
Ranking	City	Country
1	Juba	South Sudan
2	Luanda	Angola
3	Zürich	Switzerland
4	Geneva	Switzerland
5	Bern	Switzerland
6	Basel	Switzerland
7	Kinshasa	Democratic Republic of the Congo
8	Shanghai	China
9	Beijing	China
10	Seoul	South Korea

== See also ==
- Global city
- List of cities by GDP
- Megacity
- Most livable cities
