= Health care efficiency =

Health care efficiency is a comparison of delivery system outputs, such as physician visits, relative value units, or health outcomes, with inputs like cost, time, or material. Efficiency can be reported then as a ratio of outputs to inputs or a comparison to optimal productivity using stochastic frontier analysis or data envelopment analysis. An alternative approach is to look at latency times and delay times between a care order and completion of work, and stated accomplishment in relation to estimated effort.

One difficulty in creating a generalized efficiency measure is comparability of outputs. For example, if hospital A discharges 100 people at an average cost of $8000, while hospital B discharges 100 at $7000, the presumption may be that B is more efficient, but hospital B may be discharging patients with poorer health that will require readmission and net higher costs to treat.

== Measures of efficiency ==
Health care efficiency measures compare delivery system outputs, such as physician visits, RVU's, or health outcomes, with inputs like cost, time, or material. Efficiency can be reported then as a ratio of outputs to inputs or a comparison to optimal productivity using stochastic frontier analysis or data envelopment analysis.

One difficulty in creating a generalized efficiency measure is comparability of outputs. For example, if hospital A discharges 100 people at an average cost of $8000, while hospital B discharges 100 at $7000, the presumption may be that B is more efficient, but hospital B may be discharging patients with poorer health that will require readmission and net higher costs to treat.

=== Bloomberg Health-Care Efficiency Index ===
The Bloomberg index calculates an efficiency score based on a nation's life expectancy along with relative and absolute health expenditures. In 2016 Bloomberg ranked Hong Kong as the nation with the most efficient health care. The US was 50th on the list of 55.

The method has been described as being "very simplified". An economist from Nuffield Health criticised the index for not taking into account quality of life: "Diet, smoking rates, standards of living and public services more generally will all have a powerful effect on life expectancy. On the other hand, many of the most common and important operations carried out, like cataract procedures to save eyesight, wouldn't have any effect on lifespan."

== Targets to increase efficiency ==
=== Market dynamics ===
==== Increasing information ====
In general consumers are motivated to pursue the best value in a market. The health care market is complicated by the fact that pricing and quality are opaque, consumers don't usually pay the full cost of care, and health is considered a "priceless" asset.

Efforts to increase market transparency include hospital reporting requirements and insurers offering their customers estimates of provider costs for particular conditions.

==== Simplifying information ====
Efforts to simplify market information, steering participant decision-making to achieve better efficiency can include regulations like those associated with the Affordable Care Act insurance market creating minimum standards on what each plan can offer as well as placing them into "gold", "silver", or "bronze" categories.

==== Cost sharing ====
Cost sharing refers to various schemes to ensure health care resources aren't overused. In many health systems, the patient doesn't bear the full cost of services. If the person making the purchase decision effectively sees no cost, the demand for that service would tend to rise. In health care this could manifest as emergency room visits for minor ailments that could be managed through other less expensive remedies like primary care or nursing hotlines.

Common cost sharing mechanisms include copays, deductibles, and health savings accounts.

Prospective Payment System

A prospective payment system, which is used by Medicare in the United States, is a popular way to incentivize hospitals to reduce cost. A common way to structure the system is to pay hospitals and healthcare centers a pre-determined amount based on the national average cost of treating patients in a given, similar group, as classified by type of healthcare administered. For example, if a hospital spends less money per patient than the national average, then they would be able to keep the surplus. Similarly, if the hospital spends more per patient than the national average, they would incur that difference as a loss on their balance sheet.

Potential Tradeoff Between Cost and Quality of Care

An additional complication when evaluating cost efficiency in healthcare is the potential tradeoff with the quality of healthcare. The researchers Paul L.E. Greico and Ryan C. McDevitt argue that policies aiming to improve cost efficiency through incentivizing hospitals to reduce costs may inadvertently affect health outcomes or the quality of care administered. Their research analyzed the dialysis industry to ascertain whether its reliance on the Medicare prospective payment system incentivizes hospitals to sacrifice the quality of care administered in order to reduce costs. Other studies have found that the policy has had no negative effect on healthcare quality outcomes.

=== Increasing quality ===
In health care poor quality can mean patients need more services at greater expense. For example, if a patient is repeatedly misdiagnosed, they may return to the ER or doctor's office presenting the same symptoms that remain unresolved, increasing the overall use of health care resources.

==== Variations in provider practices ====
Dartmouth Atlas of Health Care states, "Among the 306 hospital referral regions in the United States, price-adjusted Medicare reimbursements varied twofold in 2014, from about $7,000 per enrollee in the lowest spending region to more than $13,000 in the highest spending region."

One investigation found that "Variation in clinical practice is substantial and is associated with poorer health outcomes, increased costs, and disparities in care. Despite these efforts, practice variation has been difficult to overcome. Challenges to reducing variation include heterogeneity and gaps in clinicians’ knowledge; economic incentives for undesired clinical behaviors; concerns about malpractice risk; physicians’ value of autonomy and personal preference; inadequate communication and decision support tools; and imbalances between clinical demand and resource capacity. Another fundamental barrier to practice standardization is that good clinical practice must sometimes vary to reflect a patient’s specific social, environmental, and biological situation. Sometimes a standard practice would not be best for a given patient. Hence, efforts to legislate or establish policies governing care have been limited because they impede the common sense that there are nearly always exceptions to a given rule."

==== Care coordination ====
Effectively sharing information among the providers participating in a patient's care can increase quality and reduce costs. Care fragmentation can result in duplication of tests, preventable hospitalizations, and increased costs.

Electronic health records are developed with the hope of improving care coordination.

=== Increasing access ===
If a patient doesn't have access to the appropriate care because they cannot afford it, they may delay treatment until the cost of that treatment and the morbidity of the disease has increased, or choose more expensive emergency care.

Some research suggests people lacking insurance use emergency rooms more. While another study that looked at the population level found that US states that expanded Medicaid actually saw an increase in ER use per capital compared to states that didn't expand access, though it didn't control for other possible variables.

=== Administrative costs ===
A 2017 Commonwealth Fund report found that hospital administrative costs comprise 1.43% of GDP in the US, but only 0.41% in Canada.

Administration costs also exist in insurance systems. In the US estimates for Medicare administrative costs range from 2 to 5%, while private insurance estimates have ranged from 12 to 18%. The Affordable Care Act requires insurers to maintain medical loss ratios of at least 80%.
