= Global Connectivity Index =

The Global Connectivity Index (GCI) is a guide for policy makers and industry leaders to develop a roadmap to the digital economy. The GCI has evolved, by increasing the number of nations tracked in its rankings and constantly strengthening the methodology and research standards it employs. The growth of the GCI’s database, since the first Index was published in 2014, offers insights and recommendations for policymakers on what it takes to succeed in the digital economy.

== Scope ==
Today, the GCI tracks and benchmarks the progress of 79 nations toward the digital economy. Its core methodology analyzes 40 indicators that identify progress made in the interplay of ICT investment, technology adoption, user experience, and market development. Based on these criteria, the Index assigns a “GCI score” for each indicator based on a future target value. The movement of even a single GCI point from year to year is considered a significant reflection of a country’s progress toward a digital economy.

The GCI offers a research framework to assess a nation’s digital transformation by looking at four economic pillars namely supply, demand, experience and potential, in addition to technology enablers - broadband, cloud, AI and Internet of Things (IoT). Under this proprietary research methodology, three clusters of nations are grouped according to their GCI position and GDP per capita. The three GCI clusters – Starters (GCI Score 23-39), Adopters (score 40-64), and Frontrunners (score 65-85) – account for almost 95% of global GDP.

Most ICT indexes focus on a single technology area such as broadband, cloud, data center or other technology enablers. What differentiates the GCI is that it is the only index available that goes deeper into key technology areas and at the same time measures their collective impact on the digital economy. In addition to the four core technology enablers, the GCI also takes into consideration other indicators such as workforce, ICT laws, and e-Government services. It is seen as an authoritative source that informs policy makers and industry leaders on their nation’s investment, adoption, quality and potential compared to their peers, as well as its related impact on the digital economy.

== Key findings ==
The widening of the global digital divide

The recurrent theme of the GCI is that Frontrunners are pulling far ahead of nations that are lower on the spectrum of the GCI S-curve. The widening gap suggests an ICT version of sociology’s “Matthew Effect”, where the “rich get richer and the poor get poorer” based on an accumulated advantage over time. Policy makers in the Adopters, and especially in the Starters, are advised to consider the deepening inequality gap as it may have long-term consequences on their ability to compete and sustain economic growth.

However, Frontrunners that invested heavily in ICT infrastructure over the years saw growth stagnate due to having now exhausted much of the value of that infrastructure. To drive sustainable growth, countries or organizations are advised to focus on participating in global win-win collaboration. The GCI 2019 outlines five roles needed to develop such global Intelligent Connectivity ecosystems. These are Decision Makers (countries, organizations or enterprises), Data Scientists, ICT Companies, Data Collectors, and End Users. These roles collaborate and leverage each other’s strengths to create value for all participants: nations, enterprises, and the public.

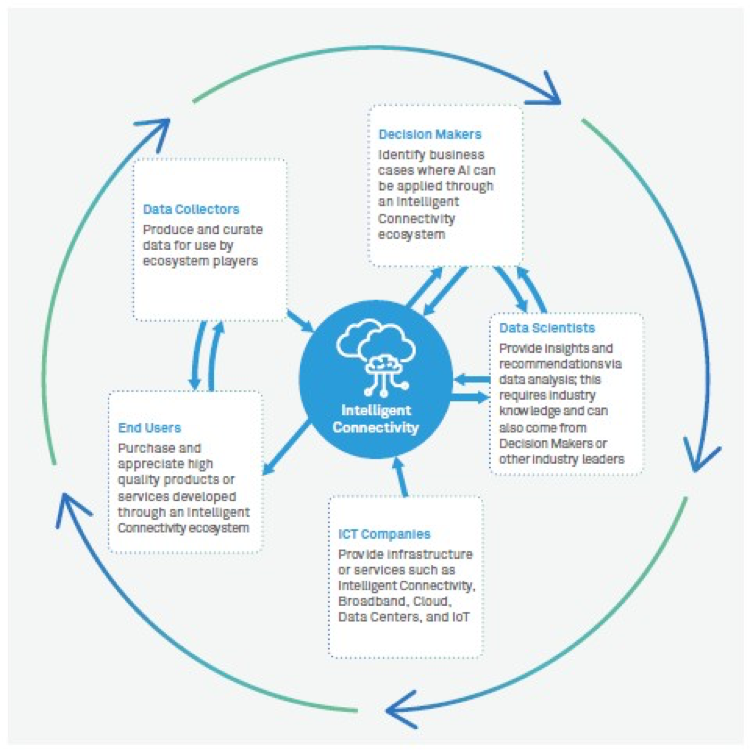

A comparison of GCI reports over the four-year period from 2015 through 2019 shows significant movement in country rankings. In the GCI 2019 report, most of the 79 nations in the rankings saw overall GCI scores improve.

Country	GCI 2019 Rank	GCI 2018 Rank	GCI 2017 Rank	GCI 2016 Rank	GCI 2015 Rank
United States	1	1	1	1	1
Switzerland	2	4	3	2	4
Sweden	3	3	4	4	2
Singapore	4	2	2	3	3
Denmark	5	5	5	7	8
Japan	6	9	6	5	9
Finland	7	7	7	8	7
Norway	8	11	9	9	6
United Kingdom	9	6	10	11	12
Netherlands	10	8	13	10	11
Australia	11	10	8	12	10
New Zealand	12	12	12	13	13
South Korea	13	13	11	6	5
Canada	14	15	15	17	16
Germany	15	16	14	14	15
Luxembourg	16	14	16	15	14
France	17	18	17	18	18
Ireland	18	17	20	20	20
Austria	19	19	18	16	19
Belgium	20	20	19	19	17
Estonia	21	21	21	21	23
Spain	22	23	22	22	21
United Arab Emirates	23	22	23	23	22
Portugal	24	24	24	24	24
Czech Republic	25	25	25	25	27
China	26	29	32	38	39
Italy	27	28	27	27	25
Lithuania	28	27	28	28	29
Slovenia	29	26	26	26	26
Malaysia	30	30	29	30	34
Hungary	31	32	30	29	31
Slovakia	32	31	31	32	30
Chile	33	33	33	36	45
Bulgaria	34	42	44	44	44
Uruguay	35	36	36	40	41
Poland	36	34	35	39	36
Romania	37	35	37	35	37
Greece	38	40	43	42	40
Croatia	39	38	41	41	35
Bahrain	40	37	40	34	32
Russia	41	39	38	37	38
Oman	42	43	34	31	28
Saudi Arabia	43	41	39	33	33
Brazil	44	44	42	43	42
Turkey	45	46	46	46	47
Kuwait	46	45	45	45	43
Belarus	47	47	47	49	48
Argentina	48	49	49	48	51
Kazakhstan	49	48	48	47	46
Ukraine	50	54	55	55	56
Mexico	51	50	53	54	50
South Africa	52	51	54	53	54
Serbia	53	52	50	52	49
Thailand	54	53	52	51	53
Colombia	55	55	51	50	52
Peru	56	56	56	56	58
Vietnam	57	60	61	57	60
Egypt	58	58	64	63	59
Philippines	59	59	57	59	62
Ecuador	60	57	59	61	61
Morocco	61	61	62	64	63
Indonesia	62	62	60	62	64
Lebanon	63	66	65	65	65
Jordan	64	63	58	58	57
India	65	67	67	67	66
Venezuela	66	65	63	60	55
Paraguay	67	64	66	66	67
Algeria	68	69	69	71	71
Bolivia	69	68	68	68	69
Botswana	70	70	72	70	73
Ghana	71	71	70	72	70
Kenya	72	72	71	69	68
Bangladesh	73	76	75	76	77
Namibia	74	73	73	73	72
Nigeria	75	74	74	75	74
Pakistan	76	75	76	74	78
Tanzania	77	78	77	77	76
Uganda	78	77	78	78	75
Ethiopia	79	79	79	79	79

GCI findings (2015-2019)

Year	GCI Findings
2019	AI’s upside potential Nations across the GCI spectrum are discovering an “AI upside potential" in 2019. Countries with the highest GCI scores can leverage Intelligent Connectivity to accelerate economic growth up to 2.4 times faster than other nations for every GCI point improvement.
2018	AI is turning Intelligent Connectivity into a gateway for a new economic growth cycle. AI readiness is integral to success in the digital economy. AI readiness assesses whether a country has met the three preconditions for AI: computing power, labeled data and algorithms.
2017	The law of increasing returns for ICT infrastructure investment – every additional US $1 invested could yield up to US$5 in GDP growth by 2025: An additional 10% of ICT infrastructure investment each year incorporated into an economic master plan beginning in 2016, over time, would have a multiplier effect that by 2025 could add US $17.6 trillion in GDP to the global economy. In real terms, the potential impact is equal to about the size of the European Union's GDP in 2016. Using this economic impact mode, the GCI 2017 finds that every additional US$1 of ICT Infrastructure investment could bring a return of US$3 in GDP in 2016, US $3.70 in 2020 and see a potential return of US $5 in 2025.
2016	Impact of 1 point of GCI: GCI scores are not abstract numbers but have a real-world effect on economic growth. A movement in GCI score of only 1 point correlates to: a 2.3% increase in productivity, a 2.2% rise in innovation and a 2.1% increase in national competitiveness.
2015	Construction of ICT infrastructure is critical for a nation's competitiveness: A 20% increase in ICT investment will grow a nation's GDP by 1%.
2014	100 billion connections by 2025, producing 175 zettabytes of data per year: By 2025, as many as 100 billion connections will be generated globally, 90% of which will come from intelligent sensors. This increase will be due to enterprises becoming enabled by the internet. By leveraging connectivity to streamline business processes, reduce costs and improve efficiency, enterprises will drive innovation and move the focus from a consumer driven internet to an industrial one.

Differences between the three GCI clusters – Starters, Adopters and Frontrunners

Starter: Average GDP per capita: US$3,800 | GCI score: 23-39 These nations are in the early stage of ICT infrastructure build-out. Their focus is on expanding connectivity to give more people access to the digital economy.

Adopter: Average GDP per capita: US$17,200 | GCI score: 40-64 Nations in this cluster experience the largest GDP growth from investment in ICT Infrastructure. Their focus is on increasing demand for high-speed connectivity to facilitate industry digitization and economic growth.

Frontrunner: Average GDP per capita: US$58,100 | GCI score: 65-85 These nations are mainly developed economies that focus on enhancing the user experience. Their priority shifts to investment in big data and IoT to develop a smarter and more efficient society.

== GCI Methodology ==
The GCI research model includes 40 indicators that can be analyzed in terms of four economic pillars and four technology enablers. Based on these indicators, the GCI measures, analyzes, and forecasts the economies tracked; quantifies the digital economy transformation journey they are undergoing; and provides a reference tool for policy makers and industry leaders. The four economic pillars are ICT supply, demand, experience, and potential. The four technology enablers are broadband, cloud services, AI, and the IoT.

The first report published in 2014 covered 25 nations and 10 industries, including finance, manufacturing, education, transportation and logistics which accounted for 95% of global GDP. The GCI 2015 report first covered 50 nations with 38 indicators. In the GCI 2016 report, two new indicators were introduced, raising the total to 40. In addition, the GCI 2016 also included updated definitions (e.g. replacing 3G coverage with 4G coverage) based on advances in ICT. In 2018, the GCI broadened the scope from 50 to 79 nations. The research methodology was expanded in 2019 again by adding the new AI perimeter which includes: Data creation, AI Investment, AI-enabled robotics and AI potential. Intelligent Connectivity’s five enabling technologies were also consolidated into four: Broadband, Cloud, IoT and AI in the same year.

== Influence ==
The GCI has gradually become a global benchmark for the assessment of digital transformation. It has been cited by more than 30 authoritative agencies including: Accenture, Asia Development Bank Institute, APEC Business Advisory Council, CITADEL, Ernst & Young, Inter American Development Bank, The International Telecommunication Union, GSMA, G20 and The Center for Transatlantic Relations.
