= KOF Globalisation Index =

Swiss index of degree of globalisation by country

The KOF Index of Globalisation is an index of the degree of globalisation of 122 countries. It was conceived by Axel Dreher at the Konjunkturforschungsstelle of ETH Zurich, in Switzerland. It was first published in 2002, and covered the period from 1970 until that year. A new version of it was published in 2017 and 2018.

The index is based on three principal criteria: economic, political and social. Unlike the Maastricht Globalisation Index, it does not take into account environmental factors.
