= Asia Power Index =

Index measuring relative power of states in Indo-Pacific

The Asia Power Index is an index that measures resources and influence to rank the relative power of states in the Indo-Pacific, published by the Lowy Institute annually from 2018. The Index ranks 26 countries and territories.

== Methodology ==
The index evaluates international power in Asia through 131 indicators across eight thematic measures: Eight thematic measures are as follows: (Percent in parentheses indicates weighting)

- Resources
  - Economic capability (17.5%)
  - Military capability (17.5%)
  - Resilience (10%)
  - Future resources (10%)
- Influence
  - Economic relationships (15%)
  - Defense networks (10%)
  - Diplomatic influence (10%)
  - Cultural influence (10%)

== Rankings ==
2025 rankings
| Rank | Country / Territory | Score | Status |
|---|---|---|---|
| 1 | United States | 80.5 | Superpowers ≥ 70 points |
| 2 | China | 73.7 | Superpowers ≥ 70 points |
| 3 | India | 40.0 | Major powers ≥ 40 points |
| 4 | Japan | 38.8 | Middle powers ≥ 10 points |
| 5 | Russia | 32.1 | Middle powers ≥ 10 points |
| 6 | Australia | 31.8 | Middle powers ≥ 10 points |
| 7 | South Korea | 31.5 | Middle powers ≥ 10 points |
| 8 | Singapore | 26.8 | Middle powers ≥ 10 points |
| 9 | Indonesia | 22.5 | Middle powers ≥ 10 points |
| 10 | Malaysia | 20.6 | Middle powers ≥ 10 points |
| 11 | Thailand | 20.1 | Middle powers ≥ 10 points |
| 12 | Vietnam | 19.9 | Middle powers ≥ 10 points |
| 13 | New Zealand | 16.8 | Middle powers ≥ 10 points |
| 14 | Taiwan | 15.7 | Middle powers ≥ 10 points |
| 15 | Philippines | 15.2 | Middle powers ≥ 10 points |
| 16 | Pakistan | 14.5 | Middle powers ≥ 10 points |
| 17 | North Korea | 12.8 | Middle powers ≥ 10 points |
| 18 | Brunei | 10.6 | Middle powers ≥ 10 points |
| 19 | Cambodia | 9.5 | Minor powers < 10 points |
| 20 | Bangladesh | 9.0 | Minor powers < 10 points |
| 21 | Sri Lanka | 7.8 | Minor powers < 10 points |
| 22 | Laos | 7.2 | Minor powers < 10 points |
| 23 | Myanmar | 7.1 | Minor powers < 10 points |
| 24 | Mongolia | 6.0 | Minor powers < 10 points |
| 25 | Nepal | 5.0 | Minor powers < 10 points |
| 26 | East Timor | 4.8 | Minor powers < 10 points |
| 27 | Papua New Guinea | 4.6 | Minor powers < 10 points |

2024 rankings
| Rank | Country / Territory | Score | Status |
|---|---|---|---|
| 1 | United States | 81.7 | Superpowers ≥ 70 points |
| 2 | China | 72.7 | Superpowers ≥ 70 points |
| 3 | India | 39.1 | Middle powers ≥ 10 points |
| 4 | Japan | 38.9 | Middle powers ≥ 10 points |
| 5 | Australia | 31.9 | Middle powers ≥ 10 points |
| 6 | Russia | 31.1 | Middle powers ≥ 10 points |
| 7 | South Korea | 31.0 | Middle powers ≥ 10 points |
| 8 | Singapore | 26.4 | Middle powers ≥ 10 points |
| 9 | Indonesia | 22.3 | Middle powers ≥ 10 points |
| 10 | Thailand | 19.8 | Middle powers ≥ 10 points |
| 11 | Malaysia | 19.6 | Middle powers ≥ 10 points |
| 12 | Vietnam | 18.7 | Middle powers ≥ 10 points |
| 13 | New Zealand | 16.3 | Middle powers ≥ 10 points |
| 14 | Taiwan | 16.0 | Middle powers ≥ 10 points |
| 15 | Philippines | 14.7 | Middle powers ≥ 10 points |
| 16 | Pakistan | 14.6 | Middle powers ≥ 10 points |
| 17 | North Korea | 11.3 | Middle powers ≥ 10 points |
| 18 | Brunei | 10.2 | Middle powers ≥ 10 points |
| 19 | Cambodia | 9.5 | Minor powers < 10 points |
| 20 | Bangladesh | 9.4 | Minor powers < 10 points |
| 21 | Sri Lanka | 7.7 | Minor powers < 10 points |
| 22 | Laos | 7.0 | Minor powers < 10 points |
| 23 | Myanmar | 6.7 | Minor powers < 10 points |
| 24 | Mongolia | 5.2 | Minor powers < 10 points |
| 25 | Nepal | 4.8 | Minor powers < 10 points |
| 26 | East Timor | 4.3 | Minor powers < 10 points |
| 27 | Papua New Guinea | 4.2 | Minor powers < 10 points |

2023 rankings
| Rank | Country / Territory | Score | Status |
|---|---|---|---|
| 1 | United States | 80.7 | Superpowers ≥ 70 points |
| 2 | China | 72.5 | Superpowers ≥ 70 points |
| 3 | Japan | 37.2 | Middle powers ≥ 10 points |
| 4 | India | 36.3 | Middle powers ≥ 10 points |
| 5 | Russia | 31.6 | Middle powers ≥ 10 points |
| 6 | Australia | 30.9 | Middle powers ≥ 10 points |
| 7 | South Korea | 29.5 | Middle powers ≥ 10 points |
| 8 | Singapore | 25.1 | Middle powers ≥ 10 points |
| 9 | Indonesia | 19.4 | Middle powers ≥ 10 points |
| 10 | Thailand | 18.7 | Middle powers ≥ 10 points |
| 11 | Malaysia | 18.0 | Middle powers ≥ 10 points |
| 12 | Vietnam | 17.5 | Middle powers ≥ 10 points |
| 13 | New Zealand | 16.8 | Middle powers ≥ 10 points |
| 14 | Taiwan | 15.2 | Middle powers ≥ 10 points |
| 15 | Pakistan | 13.9 | Middle powers ≥ 10 points |
| 16 | Philippines | 12.8 | Middle powers ≥ 10 points |
| 17 | North Korea | 10.6 | Middle powers ≥ 10 points |
| 18 | Brunei | 10.0 | Minor powers < 10 points |
| 19 | Bangladesh | 9.1 | Minor powers < 10 points |
| 20 | Cambodia | 7.8 | Minor powers < 10 points |
| 21 | Sri Lanka | 7.5 | Minor powers < 10 points |
| 22 | Myanmar | 7.5 | Minor powers < 10 points |
| 23 | Laos | 6.4 | Minor powers < 10 points |
| 24 | Mongolia | 5.0 | Minor powers < 10 points |
| 25 | Nepal | 4.2 | Minor powers < 10 points |
| 26 | Papua New Guinea | 3.3 | Minor powers < 10 points |

2021 rankings
| Rank | Country / Territory | Score | Status |
|---|---|---|---|
| 1 | United States | 82.2 | Superpowers ≥ 70 points |
| 2 | China | 74.6 | Superpowers ≥ 70 points |
| 3 | Japan | 38.7 | Middle powers ≥ 10 points |
| 4 | India | 37.7 | Middle powers ≥ 10 points |
| 5 | Russia | 33.0 | Middle powers ≥ 10 points |
| 6 | Australia | 30.8 | Middle powers ≥ 10 points |
| 7 | South Korea | 30.0 | Middle powers ≥ 10 points |
| 8 | Singapore | 26.2 | Middle powers ≥ 10 points |
| 9 | Indonesia | 19.4 | Middle powers ≥ 10 points |
| 10 | Thailand | 19.2 | Middle powers ≥ 10 points |
| 11 | Malaysia | 18.3 | Middle powers ≥ 10 points |
| 12 | Vietnam | 18.3 | Middle powers ≥ 10 points |
| 13 | New Zealand | 17.8 | Middle powers ≥ 10 points |
| 14 | Taiwan | 16.2 | Middle powers ≥ 10 points |
| 15 | Pakistan | 14.7 | Middle powers ≥ 10 points |
| 16 | Philippines | 13.1 | Middle powers ≥ 10 points |
| 17 | North Korea | 11.5 | Middle powers ≥ 10 points |
| 18 | Brunei | 9.6 | Minor powers < 10 points |
| 19 | Bangladesh | 9.4 | Minor powers < 10 points |
| 20 | Sri Lanka | 8.6 | Minor powers < 10 points |
| 21 | Myanmar | 7.4 | Minor powers < 10 points |
| 22 | Cambodia | 7.1 | Minor powers < 10 points |
| 23 | Laos | 6.0 | Minor powers < 10 points |
| 24 | Mongolia | 5.7 | Minor powers < 10 points |
| 25 | Nepal | 4.5 | Minor powers < 10 points |
| 26 | Papua New Guinea | 3.7 | Minor powers < 10 points |

2020 rankings
| Rank | Country / Territory | Score | Status |
|---|---|---|---|
| 1 | United States | 81.6 | Superpowers ≥ 70 points |
| 2 | China | 76.1 | Superpowers ≥ 70 points |
| 3 | Japan | 41.0 | Major powers ≥ 40 points |
| 4 | India | 39.7 | Middle powers ≥ 10 points |
| 5 | Russia | 33.5 | Middle powers ≥ 10 points |
| 6 | Australia | 32.4 | Middle powers ≥ 10 points |
| 7 | South Korea | 31.6 | Middle powers ≥ 10 points |
| 8 | Singapore | 27.4 | Middle powers ≥ 10 points |
| 9 | Thailand | 20.8 | Middle powers ≥ 10 points |
| 10 | Malaysia | 20.7 | Middle powers ≥ 10 points |
| 11 | Indonesia | 19.9 | Middle powers ≥ 10 points |
| 12 | Vietnam | 19.2 | Middle powers ≥ 10 points |
| 13 | New Zealand | 19.0 | Middle powers ≥ 10 points |
| 14 | Taiwan | 16.7 | Middle powers ≥ 10 points |
| 15 | Pakistan | 15.2 | Middle powers ≥ 10 points |
| 16 | Philippines | 13.3 | Middle powers ≥ 10 points |
| 17 | North Korea | 12.3 | Middle powers ≥ 10 points |
| 18 | Bangladesh | 9.2 | Minor powers < 10 points |
| 19 | Brunei | 9.1 | Minor powers < 10 points |
| 20 | Myanmar | 8.7 | Minor powers < 10 points |
| 21 | Sri Lanka | 8.3 | Minor powers < 10 points |
| 22 | Cambodia | 7.3 | Minor powers < 10 points |
| 23 | Laos | 6.0 | Minor powers < 10 points |
| 24 | Mongolia | 5.6 | Minor powers < 10 points |
| 25 | Nepal | 4.4 | Minor powers < 10 points |
| 26 | Papua New Guinea | 3.8 | Minor powers < 10 points |
