= ECA International =

- ECA Corporate Logo 2026
- Company type: Global Mobility & Expatriate Management
- Industry: HR, Global Mobility & International Workforce Management
- Founded: 1971
- Headquarters: London; New York City; Sydney; Hong Kong
- Number of locations: 4 Global Offices
- Key people: Gary Browning (Executive Chairman) Mark Ash (CEO)
- Products: Remuneration Data; Cost of living Indices; Local and expatriate salary data; Assignment Management; Global Mobility Consultancy; Business Travel Compliance; Expatriate Payroll Management; Employee benefits; Tax calculation; Social security reports; Labour law; Rental accommodation; Location ratings allowance data; Country profiles; Security reports; Enterprise services; Managing mobility survey; Expatriate salary management survey; International HR practitioner course
- Services: ECA Expert; ECA Insight; ECA Assign; ECA Consult; ECA Comply; ECA Pay; ECA Training; ECA Enterprise; MyECA
- Owner: Pelican Capital LLC
- Number of employees: 130
- Website: eca.global

ECA International provides data, software services, consultancy and training to help companies manage compensation and benefits for international workers moving around the world on a short-term, long-term or permanent basis.

The company offers data on cost of living, salary, accommodation, tax, labour law, benefits and quality of life for international assignees in over 480 locations worldwide. Clients can subscribe to services including country reports and allowance calculators, or they can request ad hoc consultancy projects including global mobility policy design and review.

The company runs surveys throughout the year to enable clients to benchmark their management policy for expatriate employees. It also provides regular global mobility events and training sessions including online courses and its two-day classroom course The International HR Practitioner (Asia only).

As a software provider, ECA also provides various calculators and tools. ECAEnterprise is their assignment management system enabling companies to optimise their global mobility programme (GM), providing greater clarity, control and efficiency to GM teams.

== History ==
ECA International was founded by a group of international companies in 1971, in order to simplify the exchange of information for the management of expatriates. ECA, which stands for Employment Conditions Abroad International, has offices in London, New York City, Sydney and Hong Kong.
