= List of countries by mortality rate =

Mortality rate of countries, deaths per thousand

This article includes the list of countries by crude mortality rate.

== Methodology ==
Crude mortality rate refers to the number of deaths over a given period divided by the person-years lived by the population over that period. It is usually expressed in units of deaths per 1,000 individuals per year.

The list is based on CIA World Factbook 2023 estimates, unless indicated otherwise.

Many developing countries have far higher proportions of young people, and lower proportions of older people, than some developed countries, and thus may have much higher age-specific mortality rates while having lower crude mortality rates.

== List ==
Country / territory	Rate
Lithuania	15.17
Serbia	15.12
Romania	14.92
Latvia	14.69
Bulgaria	14.31
Ukraine	21.70
Russia	13.27
Estonia	13.13
Croatia	12.98
Hungary	12.89
Belarus	12.81
Moldova	12.51
Afghanistan	12.08
Greece	12.02
Germany	11.97
Japan	11.74
Central African Republic	11.51
Somalia	11.43
Saint Pierre and Miquelon (France)	11.36
Italy	11.27
Peru	11.04
Monaco	10.92
Lesotho	10.90
Portugal	10.90
Czech Republic	10.77
Georgia	10.76
Slovenia	10.46
Finland	10.37
Montenegro	10.30
Bosnia and Herzegovina	10.26
Slovakia	10.18
Isle of Man (UK)	10.17
Spain	10.11
Puerto Rico (US)	10.00
Mozambique	9.93
Austria	9.86
United Kingdom	9.81
Korea, North	9.66
Niger	9.66
India	9.65
North Macedonia	9.61
Belgium	9.57
Denmark	9.55
Armenia	9.54
Eswatini	9.53
France	9.51
Sweden	9.50
Cuba	9.37
Poland	9.37
Netherlands	9.27
South Africa	9.25
South Sudan	9.22
Chad	9.21
Bermuda (UK)	9.20
Cook Islands (NZ)	9.20
Guernsey (UK)	9.17
Saint Barthelemy (France)	9.16
Sierra Leone	9.14
Uruguay	9.12
Greenland (Denmark)	9.07
US Virgin Islands	8.99
Botswana	8.98
Mauritius	8.95
Equatorial Guinea	8.90
San Marino	8.83
Curacao (Netherlands)	8.78
Gibraltar (UK)	8.74
Aruba (Netherlands)	8.69
Malta	8.61
Faroe Islands (Denmark)	8.61
Nigeria	8.52
Zimbabwe	8.51
Trinidad and Tobago	8.48
United States	8.42
Switzerland	8.37
Grenada	8.34
Palau	8.31
Mali	8.30
Congo Republic	8.23
Saint Helena, Ascension and Tristan da Cunha (UK)	8.19
Canada	8.17
Saint Lucia	8.17
Dominica	8.12
Kazakhstan	8.05
Liechtenstein	8.05
Barbados	8.03
Hong Kong	8.03
Andorra	7.98
Taiwan	7.98
Guinea	7.97
Norway	7.93
Tuvalu	7.90
Thailand	7.86
Colombia	7.84
Benin	7.82
China	7.82
Angola	7.80
Jersey (UK)	7.75
Congo DR	7.74
World (2020)	7.70
Kosovo	7.65
Saint Vincent and the Grenadines	7.58
Cameroon	7.54
Burkina Faso	7.50
Cote d'Ivoire	7.45
Jamaica	7.44
Albania	7.36
Mauritania	7.33
Guinea-Bissau	7.32
Saint Kitts and Nevis	7.32
Argentina	7.28
Korea, South	7.28
Haiti	7.17
Luxembourg	7.17
Myanmar	7.14
Djibouti	7.08
Mexico	7.07
Cyprus	6.99
Guyana	6.95
Azerbaijan	6.92
Kiribati	6.91
Brazil	6.90
Seychelles	6.90
New Zealand	6.89
Indonesia	6.77
Australia	6.76
Ireland	6.74
Namibia	6.64
Suriname	6.63
Morocco	6.61
Eritrea	6.60
Chile	6.58
Iceland	6.57
Venezuela	6.55
Sri Lanka	6.54
Comoros	6.49
Bahamas	6.47
Liberia	6.46
Fiji	6.44
Nauru	6.39
Tunisia	6.38
Mongolia	6.33
Philippines	6.1
Dominican Republic	6.31
Laos	6.26
Sint Maarten (Netherlands)	6.24
Sudan	6.19
American Samoa (US)	6.19
Turkey	6.09
Guam	6.08
Kyrgyzstan	6.07
São Tomé and Príncipe	6.07
Montserrat (UK)	6.07
Cayman Islands (UK)	6.06
Bhutan	6.05
Zambia	6.02
Ghana	5.99
Turkmenistan	5.96
Pakistan	5.94
El Salvador	5.92
Madagascar	5.92
New Caledonia (France)	5.92
Wallis and Futuna (France)	5.90
Panama	5.88
Burundi	5.85
Cape Verde	5.77
Rwanda	5.77
Vietnam	5.77
Malaysia	5.72
Gambia	5.71
Cambodia	5.70
Antigua and Barbuda	5.69
Tajikistan	5.67
French Polynesia	5.67
Ethiopia	5.60
Gabon	5.59
Nepal	5.59
Northern Mariana Islands (US)	5.58
Lebanon	5.57
Timor-Leste	5.55
Yemen	5.54
Bangladesh	5.50
Papua New Guinea	5.48
British Virgin Islands	5.44
Uzbekistan	5.43
Samoa	5.38
Iran	5.20
Nicaragua	5.19
Ecuador	5.18
Togo	5.16
Israel	5.05
Tanzania	5.02
Senegal	5.00
Costa Rica	4.97
Kenya	4.95
Tonga	4.95
Paraguay	4.90
Guatemala	4.89
Uganda	4.87
Macau	4.81
Anguilla (UK)	4.72
Saint Martin (France)	4.71
Honduras	4.69
Malawi	4.51
Algeria	4.33
Bolivia	4.33
Egypt	4.32
Marshall Islands	4.30
Maldives	4.20
Micronesia	4.20
Singapore	4.15
Syria	4.07
Vanuatu	3.99
Solomon Islands	3.95
Belize	3.89
Iraq	3.88
Brunei	3.85
Turks and Caicos Islands (UK)	3.52
Libya	3.45
Saudi Arabia	3.45
Oman	3.21
Jordan	3.11
Bahrain	2.83
Kuwait	2.27
United Arab Emirates	1.62
Qatar	1.42

== See also ==
- List of countries by infant and under-five mortality rates
