= Global Enabling Trade Report =

Trade report

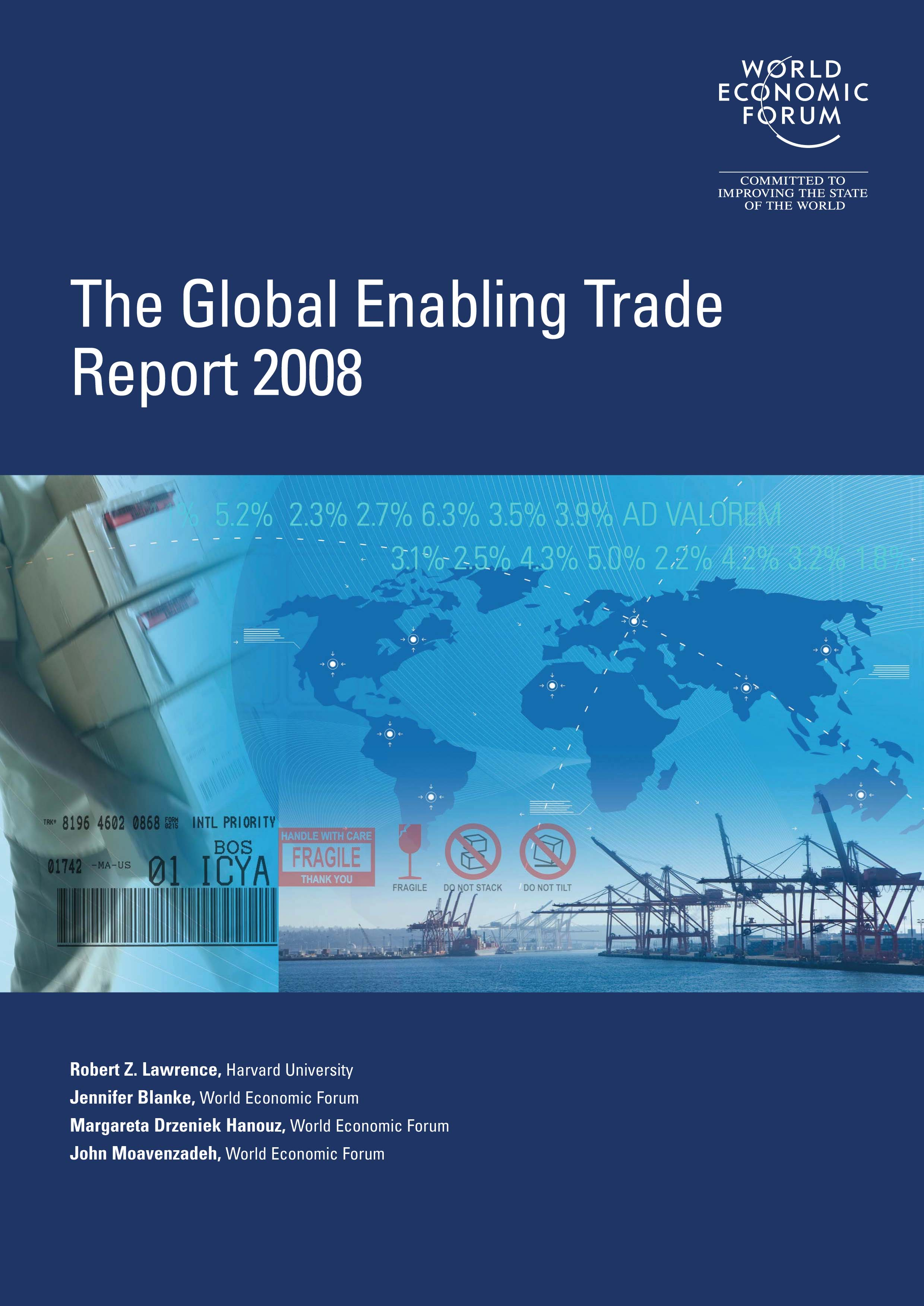

The Global Enabling Trade Report was first published in 2008 by the World Economic Forum.

The 2008 report covers 118 major and emerging economies. At the core of the report is the Enabling Trade Index which ranks the countries using data from different sources (e.g., World Economic Forum's Executive Opinion Survey, International Trade Centre, World Bank, the United Nations Conference on Trade and Development (UNCTAD), IATA, ITU, Global Express Association).

The Enabling Trade Index measures the factors, policies and services that facilitate the trade in goods across borders and to destination. It is made up of four sub-indexes:

1. Market access
2. Border administration
3. Transport and communications infrastructure
4. Business environment

Each of these sub-indexes contains two to three pillars that assess different aspects of a country's trade environment.

== 2016 rankings ==
Global Enabling Trade Report 2016

1. Singapore 5.97
2. Netherlands 5.70
3. Hong Kong 5.66
4. Luxembourg 5.63
5. Sweden 5.61
6. Finland 5.60
7. Austria 5.52
8. United Kingdom 5.52
9. Germany 5.49
10. Belgium 5.45
11. Switzerland 5.45
12. Denmark 5.42
13. France 5.37
14. Estonia 5.32
15. Spain 5.28
16. Japan 5.28
17. Norway 5.27
18. New Zealand 5.27
19. Iceland 5.27
20. Ireland 5.27
21. Chile 5.26
22. United States 5.24
23. United Arab Emirates 5.23
24. Canada 5.15
25. Czech Republic 5.12
26. Australia 5.10
27. South Korea 5.04
28. Portugal 5.01
29. Lithuania 5.01
30. Israel 4.99

== 2014 rankings ==
Global Enabling Trade Report 2014

1. Singapore 5.9
2. Hong Kong 5.5
3. Netherlands 5.3
4. New Zealand 5.2
5. Finland 5.2
6. United Kingdom 5.2
7. Switzerland 5.2
8. Chile 5.1
9. Sweden 5.1
10. Germany 5.1
11. Luxembourg 5.1
12. Norway 5.1
13. Japan 5.1
14. Canada 5.0
15. United States 5.0
16. United Arab Emirates 5.0
17. Denmark 5.0
18. Austria 5.0
19. Qatar 4.9
20. Belgium 4.9
21. France 4.9
22. Iceland 4.9
23. Australia 4.9
24. Taiwan 4.9
25. Malaysia 4.8
26. Ireland 4.8
27. Spain 4.8
28. Estonia 4.8
29. Mauritius 4.7
30. South Korea 4.7

== 2012 rankings ==
Global Enabling Trade Report 2012

1. Singapore 6.14
2. Hong Kong 5.67
3. Denmark 5.41
4. Sweden 5.39
5. New Zealand 5.34
6. Finland 5.34
7. Netherlands 5.32
8. Switzerland 5.29
9. Canada 5.22
10. Luxembourg 5.20
11. United Kingdom 5.18
12. Norway 5.17
13. Germany 5.13
14. Chile 5.12
15. Austria 5.12
16. Iceland 5.08
17. Australia 5.08
18. Japan 5.08
19. United Arab Emirates 5.07
20. France 5.03
21. Belgium 4.96
22. Ireland 4.96
23. United States 4.90
24. Malaysia 4.90
25. Oman 4.86
26. Estonia 4.85
27. Saudi Arabia 4.84
28. Israel 4.82
29. Taiwan 4.81
30. Bahrain 4.80

== 2010 rankings ==
Global Enabling Trade Report 2010

1. Singapore 6.06
2. Hong Kong 5.70
3. Denmark 5.41
4. Sweden 5.41
5. Switzerland 5.37
6. New Zealand 5.33
7. Norway 5.32
8. Canada 5.29
9. Luxembourg 5.28
10. Netherlands 5.26
11. Iceland 5.26
12. Finland 5.25
13. Germany 5.20
14. Austria 5.17
15. Australia 5.13
16. United Arab Emirates 5.12
17. United Kingdom 5.06
18. Chile 5.06
19. United States 5.03
20. France 5.02
21. Ireland 5.00
22. Bahrain 4.95
23. Estonia 4.90
24. Belgium 4.89
25. Japan 4.80
26. Israel 4.76
27. South Korea 4.72
28. Taiwan 4.72
29. Oman 4.71
30. Malaysia 4.71

== 2009 rankings ==
Global Enabling Trade Report 2009

1. Singapore 5.97
2. Hong Kong 5.57
3. Switzerland 5.44
4. Denmark 5.44
5. Sweden 5.44
6. Canada 5.35
7. Norway 5.33
8. Finland 5.33
9. Austria 5.29
10. Netherlands 5.27
11. New Zealand 5.27
12. Germany 5.24
13. Luxembourg 5.12
14. Australia 5.07
15. Ireland 5.02
16. United States 5.02
17. France 5.02
18. United Arab Emirates 4.97
19. Chile 4.96
20. United Kingdom 4.93
21. Belgium 4.92
22. Estonia 4.84
23. Japan 4.78
24. Bahrain 4.76
25. Taiwan 4.75
26. South Korea 4.73
27. Spain 4.72
28. Malaysia 4.70
29. Israel 4.66
30. Portugal 4.63

== 2008 rankings ==
Global Enabling Trade Report 2008

1. Hong Kong 6.04
2. Singapore 5.71
3. Sweden 5.66
4. Norway 5.65
5. Canada 5.62
6. Denmark 5.62
7. Finland 5.61
8. Germany 5.58
9. Switzerland 5.58
10. New Zealand 5.52
11. Netherlands 5.51
12. Luxembourg 5.50
13. Japan 5.43
14. United States 5.42
15. Austria 5.42
16. United Kingdom 5.30
17. Australia 5.22
18. Belgium 5.21
19. France 5.20
20. Ireland 5.20
21. Taiwan 5.15
22. Spain 5.03
23. United Arab Emirates 4.96
24. South Korea 4.95
25. Estonia 4.89
26. Portugal 4.88
27. Chile 4.88
28. Israel 4.76
29. Malaysia 4.75
30. Slovakia 4.74
