= Global Entrepreneurship Index =

Economic activity index

The Global Entrepreneurship Index (GEI) is an economic activity index compiled by US-based The Global Entrepreneurship and Development Institute, which looks at how individual countries across the world allocate resources to promoting entrepreneurship, if indeed they do. The institute was founded by economic scholars from the Imperial College London, the LSE and the University of Pécs (Hungary) to produce the GEI, which gives a rating of an individual country's entrepreneurship ecosystem.

== See also ==
- Global Entrepreneurship Monitor
