= Outline of globalization =

Overview of and topical guide to globalization

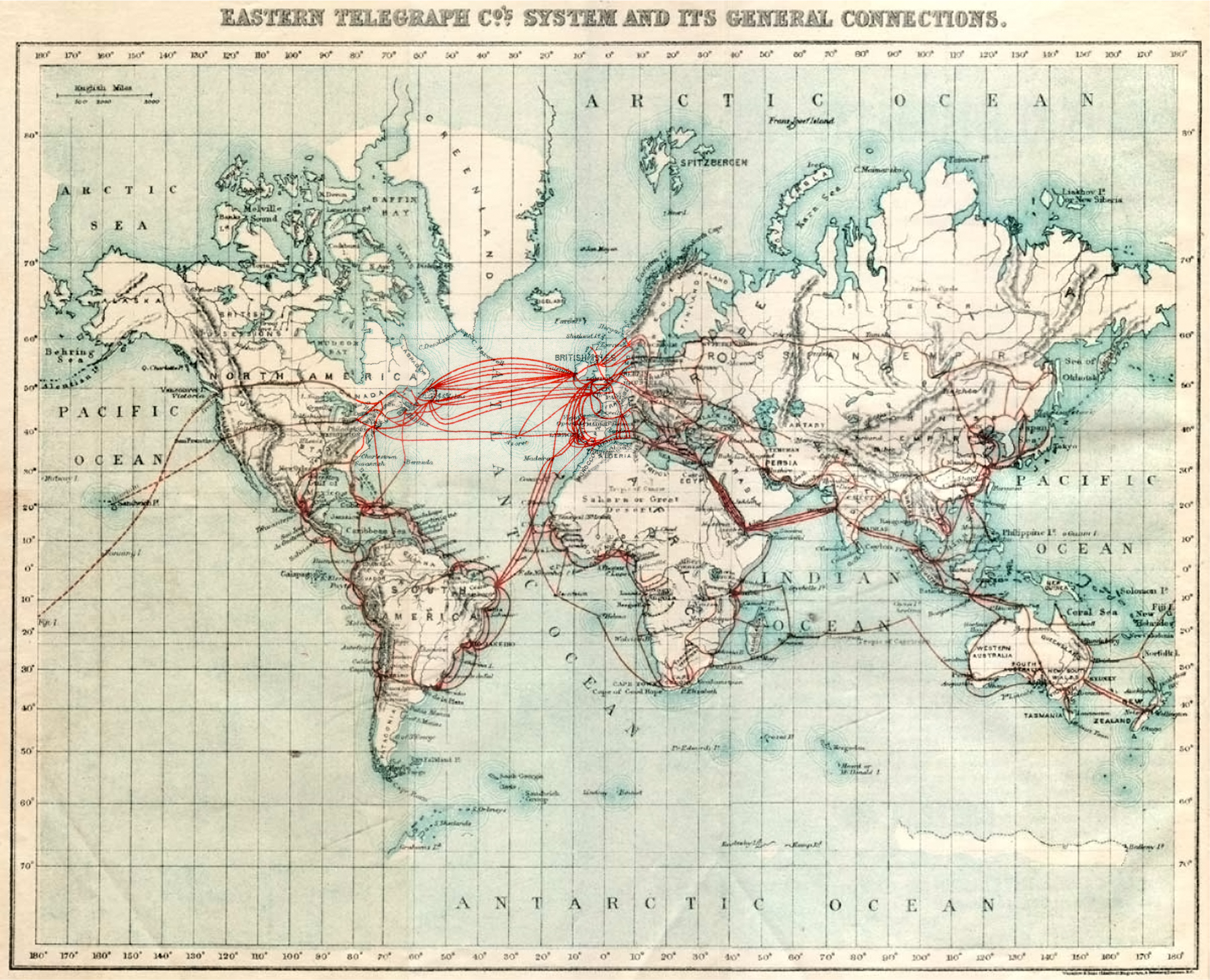
Eastern Telegraph Company 1901 chart of undersea telegraph cabling. An example of modern globalizing technology in the beginning of the 20th century.

The following outline is provided as an overview of and topical guide to the broad, interdisciplinary subject of globalization:

Globalization (or globalisation) – processes of international integration arising from the interchange of world views, products, ideas, and other aspects of culture. Advances in transportation and telecommunications infrastructure, including the rise of the Internet, are major factors in globalization, generating further interdependence of economic and cultural activities. Globalizing processes affect and are affected by business and work organization, economics, sociocultural resources, and the natural environment.

== Global studies ==
World citizen badge

Global studies – interdisciplinary and multidisciplinary academic study of globalizing forces and trends. Global studies may include the investigation of one or more aspects of globalization, but tend to concentrate on how globalizing trends are redefining the relationships between states, organizations, societies, communities, and individuals, creating new challenges that cannot be solved by nations or markets alone. Study of the factors contributing to globalization may originate in many academic concentrations, such as political science, economics, and sociology.

== History ==
Animated map showing the development of colonial empires from 1492 to present

History of globalization – generally broken-down into three periods: Archaic, Proto-globalization, and Modern.

- The Archaic period is defined as events and developments from the time of the earliest civilizations until roughly 1600.
- The period of Proto-globalization roughly spans the years between 1600 and 1800. It was largely shaped in this era by the operations of colonialism.
- The Modern period of globalization covers from the 19th century until the present time. Imperialism and industrialization have figured largely in shaping modern globalizing forces and trends.

== Globalization concepts ==
Links below are to articles, unless otherwise specified.

=== Globalization-related theories ===
Since globalization is not an independent phenomenon but is highly interrelated with world views, products, ideas, and other aspects of culture, explanations of why globalization occurs and what the effects of globalization are or can be expected are related to theories ranging from economic development to revolutionary socialism.

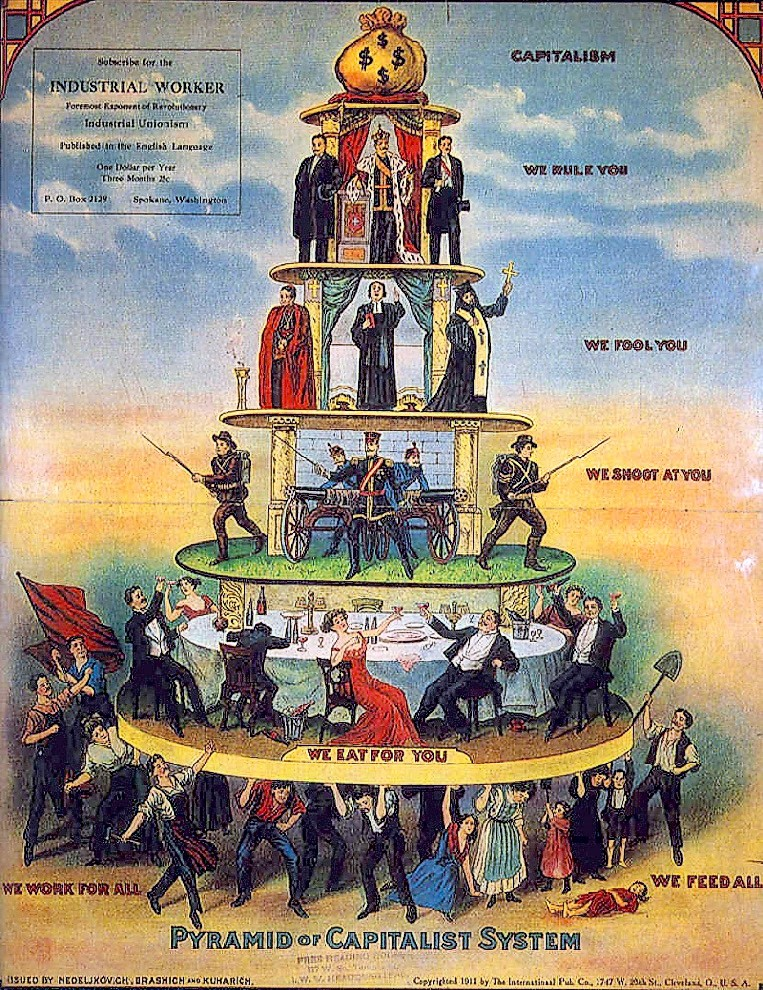
Pyramid of Capitalist System, 1911 Industrial Worker publication advocating industrial unionism. It also shows the critique of capitalism.

- Coupled human–environment systems
- Capitalism-related
- Dependency theory
- Ecological modernization
- Economic development
- Economic nationalism
- Engaged theory
- Industrialisation
- Mercantilism
- Modernization
- Modernization theory
- New international division of labour
- Post-contemporary society
- Post-industrial society
- Postmodernism
- Primitive accumulation of capital
- Regulation theory
- Revolutionary socialism
- Sociocultural evolution
- World-systems theory

=== Globalization-related indices ===
- List of globalization-related indices
- Corruption Perceptions Index
- Democracy Index
- Global economic indicators (category)
- Freedom in the World
- Global city
- Globalization Index

== Aspects of globalization ==
=== Global business organization ===
International business development and the organization of business and trade worldwide are fundamental aspects of globalization and the development of globalizing systems.

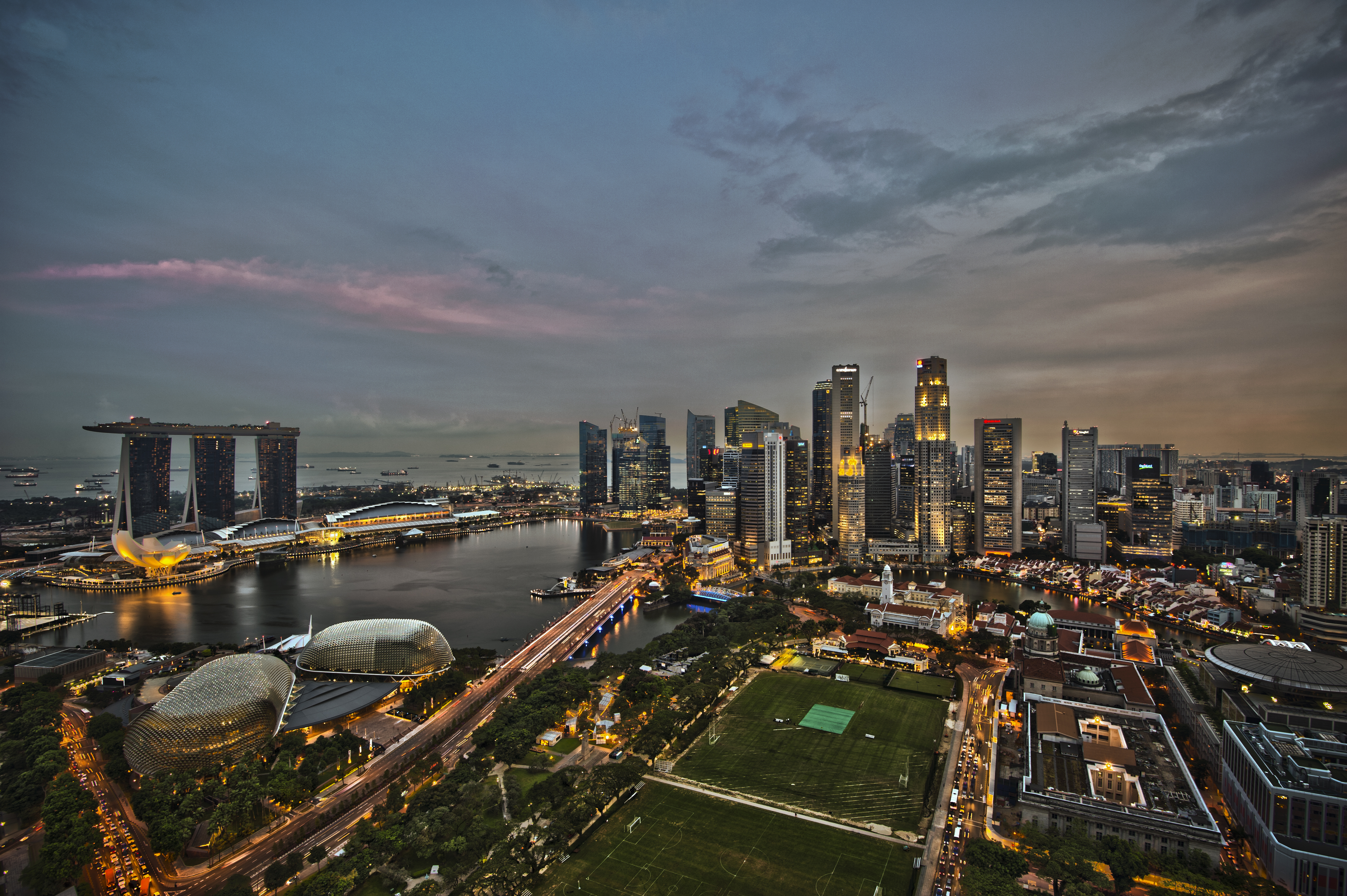
Singapore, the top country in the Enabling Trade Index, embraced globalization and became a highly developed country.

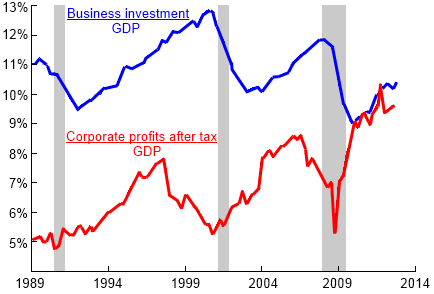
Red: U.S. corporate profits after tax. Blue: U.S. nonresidential business investment, both as fractions of GDP, 1989–2012. Wealth concentration of corporate profits in global tax havens due to tax avoidance spurred by imposition of austerity measures can stall investment, inhibiting further growth.

- Global business organization (category)
- Corporate citizenship
- Global sourcing
  - Cross-border leasing
  - Global strategy
    - Global R&D management
  - Intermodal freight transport
  - Low-cost country sourcing
  - Outsourcing
  - Supply chain management
    - Global supply-chain finance
- Industrial ecology
- International business
- Standardization
  - International standards
    - International Organization for Standardization (ISO)
- International trade
  - Free trade zones
  - Special Economic Zones
- Multinational companies

=== Economic globalization ===
Economic globalization

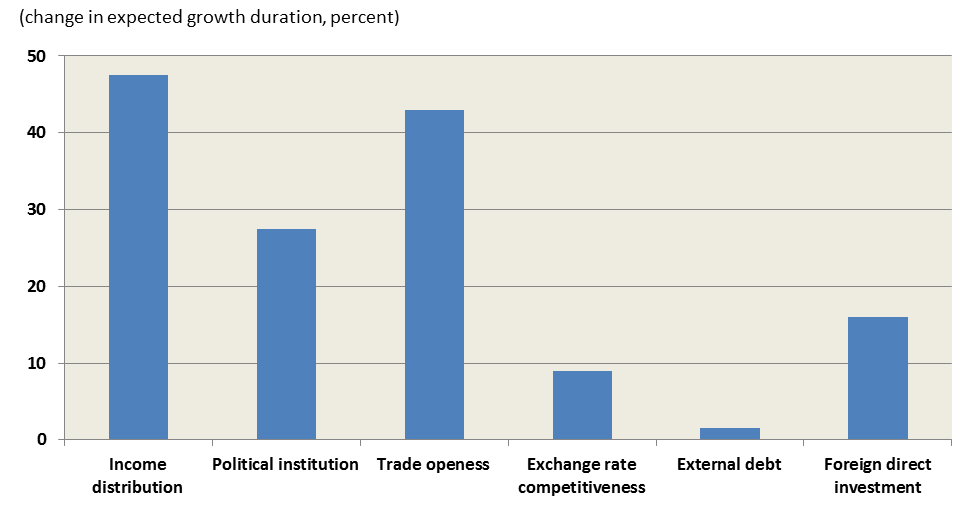
Of the factors influencing the duration of economic growth in both developed and developing countries, income equality has a more beneficial impact than trade openness, sound political institutions, and foreign investment.

Economic globalization – increasing economic interdependence of national economies across the world through a rapid increase in cross-border movement of goods, services, technology, and capital. International economic activities and institutions that influence or characterize economic globalization include:

- Economic globalization (category)
- Free markets
- International economics
  - Development economics
  - Economic integration
  - International finance
    - Global financial system
  - International monetary systems
    - World currency
  - North–South divide
  - Social economy
  - Trade globalization
  - World economy
- Global economic indicators (category)

=== Sociocultural globalization ===
All aspects of globalization are essentially sociocultural in nature. Here, aspects of the globalization of culture are detailed, including cultural diversity, cultural homogenization and its backlash, as well as multiculturalism, multilingualism, global civics, world governance and other political developments and social movements related to globalization.

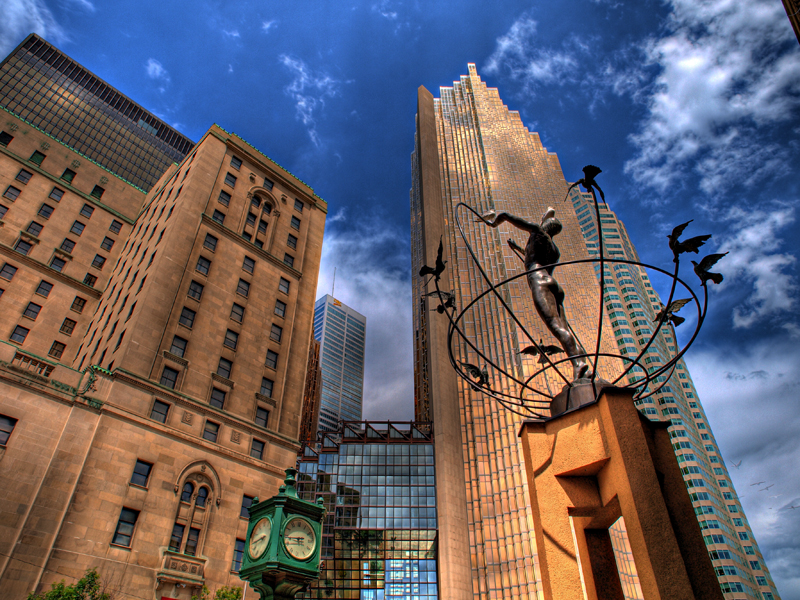
Monument to Multiculturalism by Francesco Perilli in Toronto, Canada. Four identical sculptures are located in Buffalo City, South Africa; Changchun, China; Sarajevo, Bosnia, and Sydney, Australia.

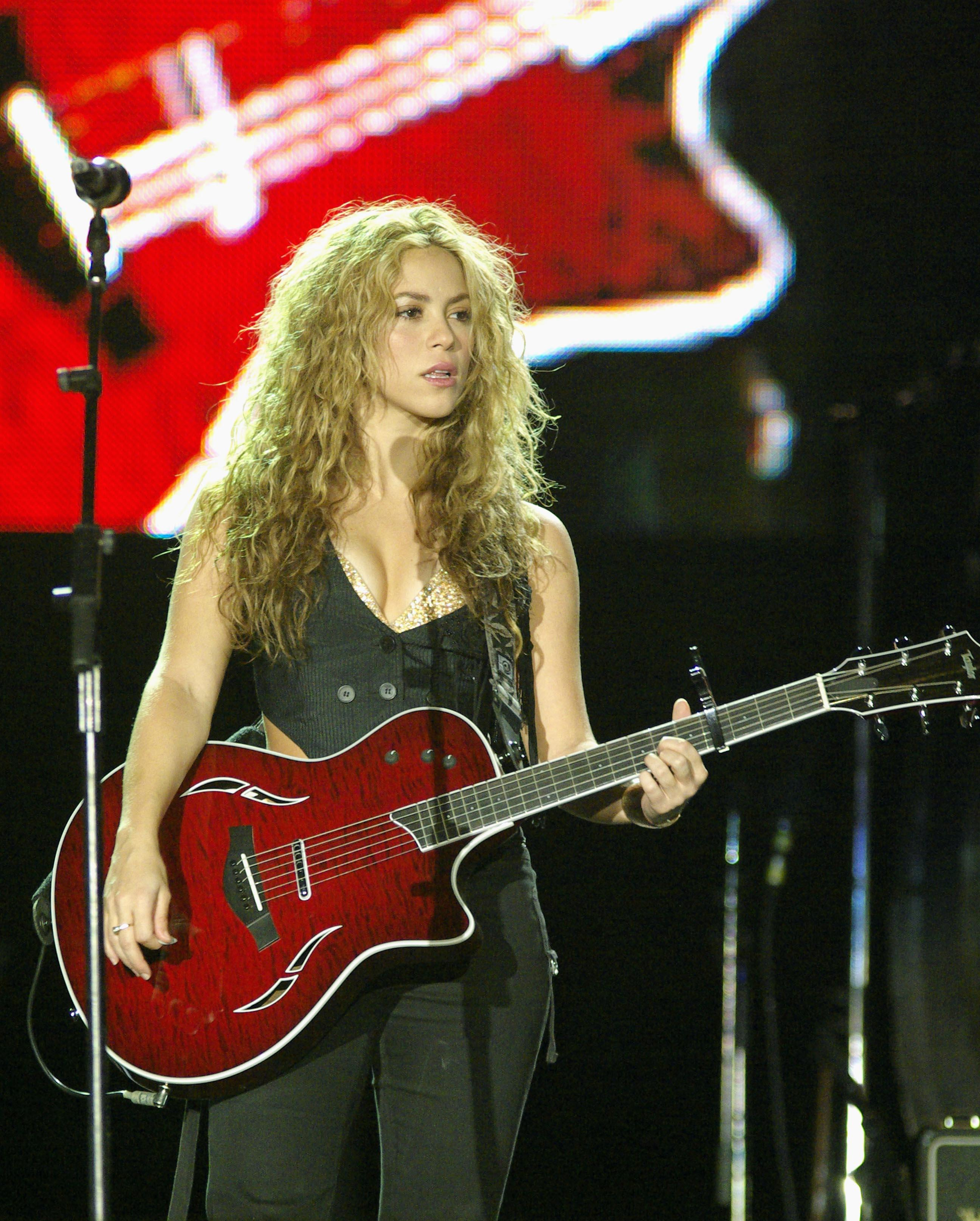
Shakira, a Colombian multilingual singer-songwriter, playing outside her home country

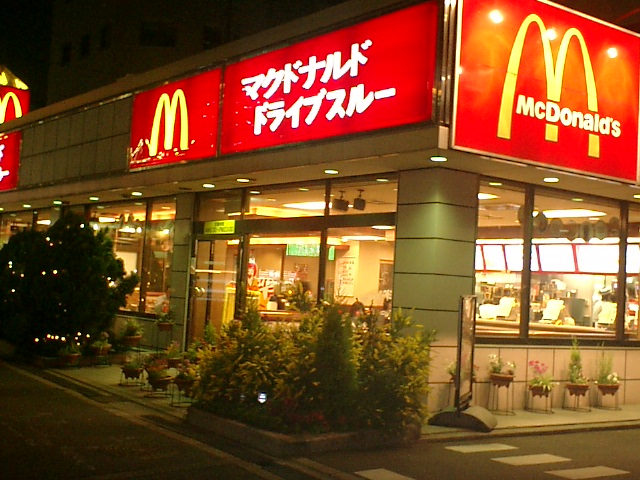
A McDonald's in Osaka, Japan, exemplifies the McDonaldization of global society.

- Anti-globalization
- Criticisms of globalization
- Cultural globalization
  - Cultural appropriation
  - Cultural diversity
  - Cultural homogenization
  - Interculturalism
  - Multiculturalism
  - Time–space compression
- Democratization of technology
- Economic liberalism
- Endangered languages
- Global civics
- Global elite
- Global digital divide
- Global health
- Global inequality (category)
  - International inequality
- Global politics
  - Global justice
  - International law
    - International human rights law
  - World democracy
  - World government
  - Consumer movement
  - Occupy movement
  - Supranational union
  - Transnationalism
- Global village
- Globalism
- International development
- International education
- International organization
- Internet
  - World Wide Web
- Multilingualism
- Pizza effect
- Race to the bottom
- Social web
- Transformation of culture
- Transnational cinema
- Transnational organized crime
- Universal Declaration of Human Rights
- Westernization
  - Americanization
    - Cocacolonization
    - Disneyfication
    - McDonaldization
- World Englishes
- World Music Awards
- World population
- World Values Survey

=== Workforce globalization ===
Along with the globalization of business comes a new spatial division of labor, which occurs when production processes are no longer confined to national economies and labor becomes sourced from different parts of the globe. This global workforce has implications ranging from immigration policy to basic human and labor rights.

Brazilian multiple entry visa in a US passport, with immigration stamps from Brazil, France, and the United States

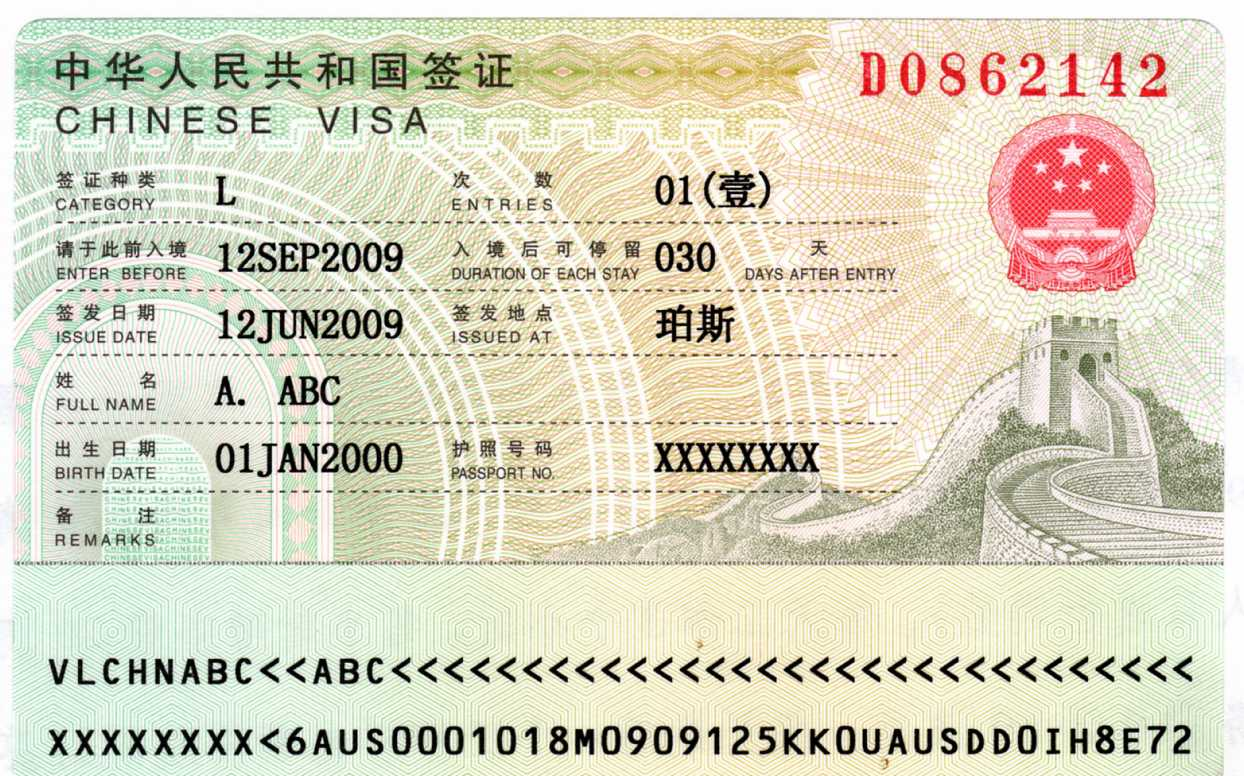
Entry tourist visa to China

- Global workforce (category)
- New international division of labour
  - Brain drain
    - Reverse brain drain
  - Contingent workforce
  - Human migration
    - Expatriate
    - Foreign born
    - Immigration policy
      - Illegal immigration
    - Migrant worker
  - Visas
  - International labor standards
- Global labor arbitrage
  - Global Labour University
  - Optional Practical Training
- Global workforce
- Labor rights
- Offshoring
- Precarious work
- Visa policy by country (category)

=== Global natural environment ===
The natural environment can be contrasted with the built environment, comprising the areas and components that are strongly influenced by humans. In the age of globalization, few absolutely natural environments remain. Human challenges to the natural environment, such as climate change, cross-boundary water and air pollution, over-fishing of the ocean, and the spread of invasive species require at least transnational and, often, global solutions.

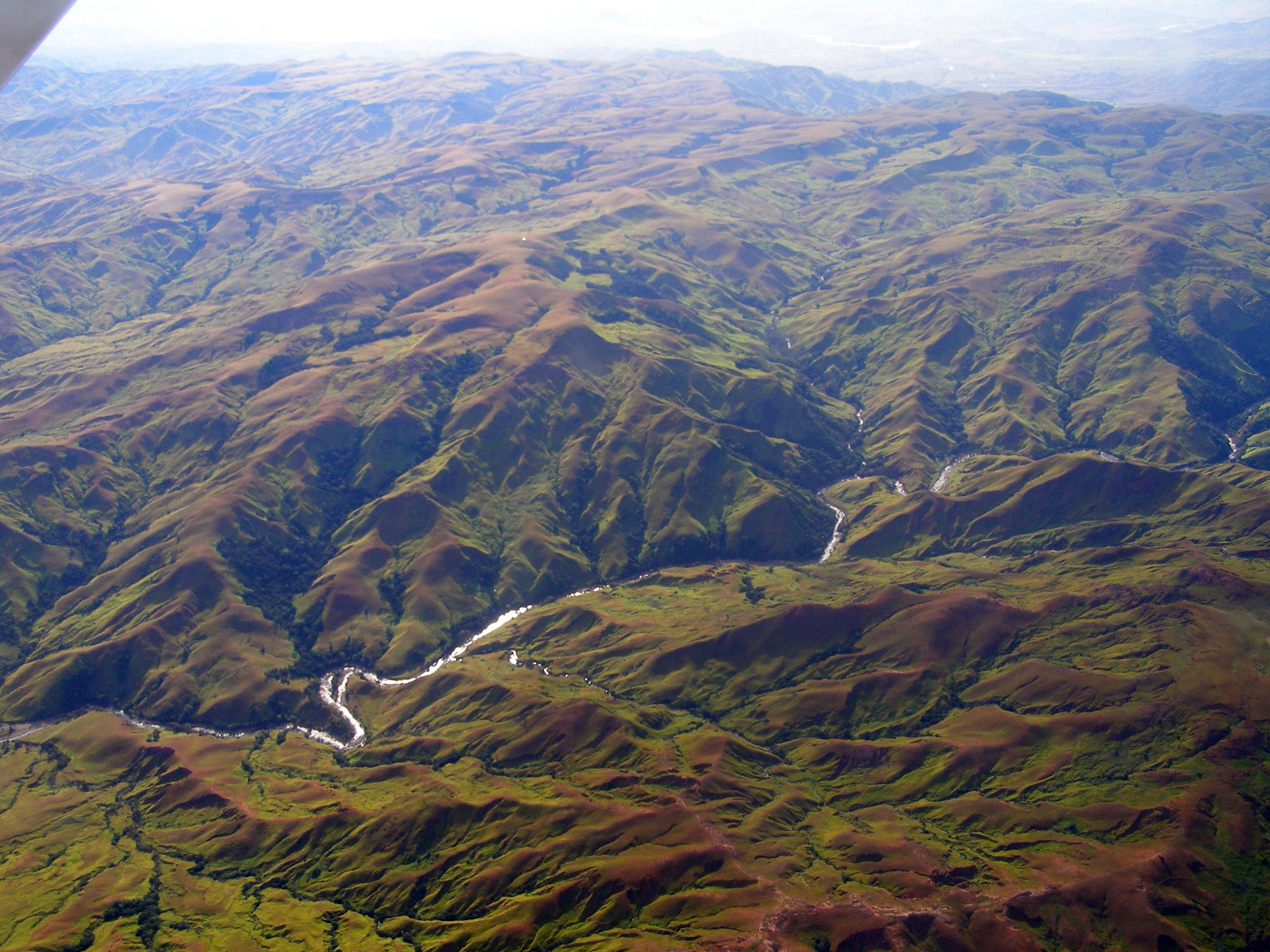
Deforestation of the Madagascar Highland Plateau has led to extensive siltation and unstable flows of western rivers.

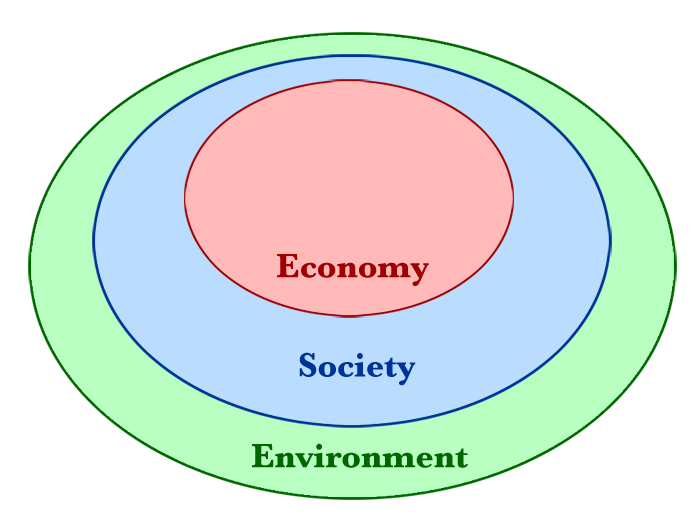
The three nested systems of sustainability – the economy wholly contained by society, wholly contained by the biophysical environment. Clickable.

- Global natural environment (category)
- Environmental treaties (category)
- Biological globalization (category)
- Natural environment
  - Global biodiversity
    - Invasive species
      - Columbian Exchange
  - Climate change
    - Global dimming
    - Global warming
    - Ozone depletion
  - Planetary boundaries
  - World ocean
- Earth system science
- Ecological economics
- Ecological imperialism
- Environmental social science
- Human ecology
- Global change
- Global commons
- Globalization and disease
- Sustainability
- Water scarcity
- World energy consumption
- World Environment Day

== Globalization issues ==
Processes of globalization present humankind with many issues that are considered problematic in at least one culture or society, and often multiple societies.

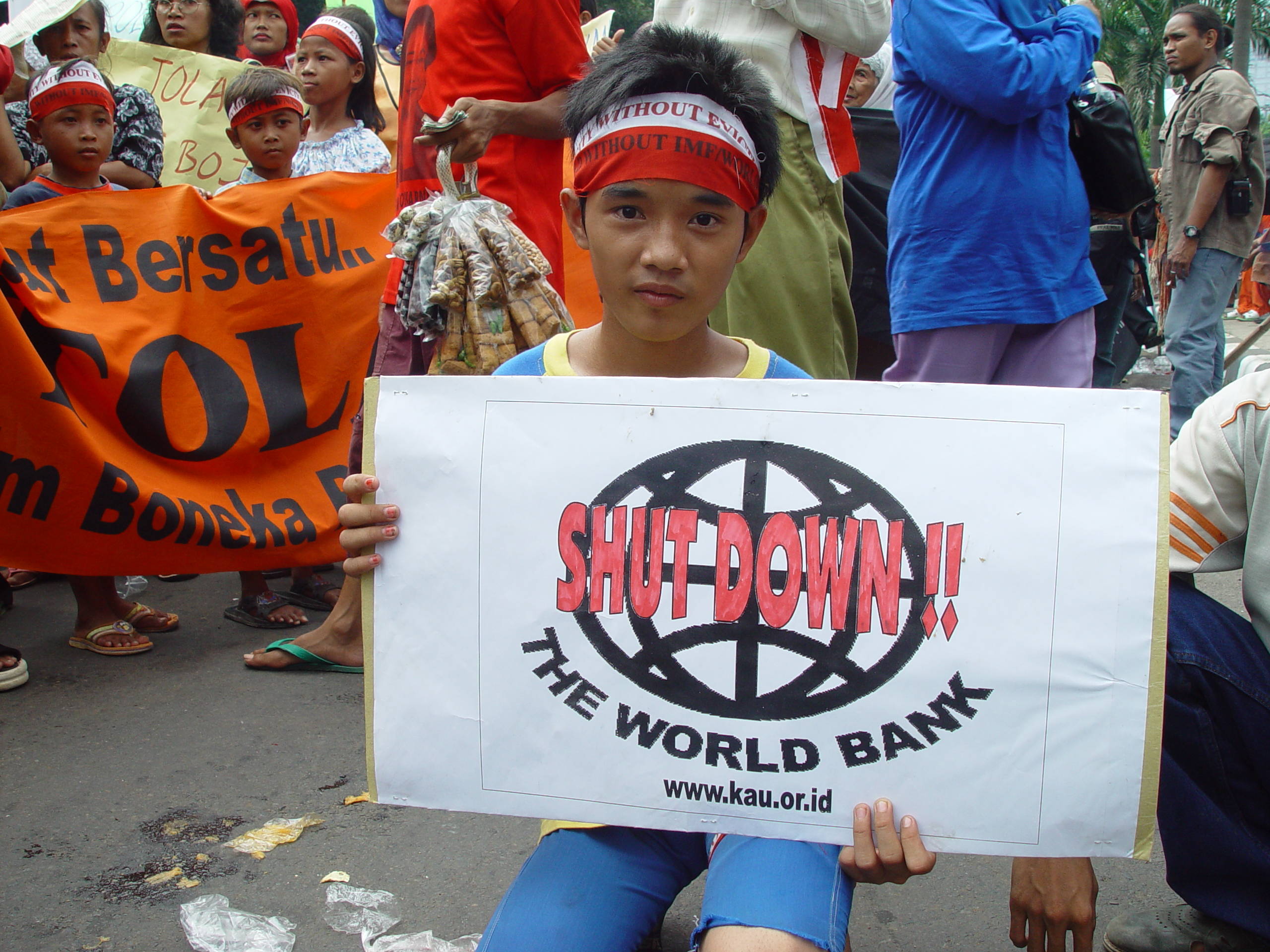
World Bank Protester, Jakarta, Indonesia

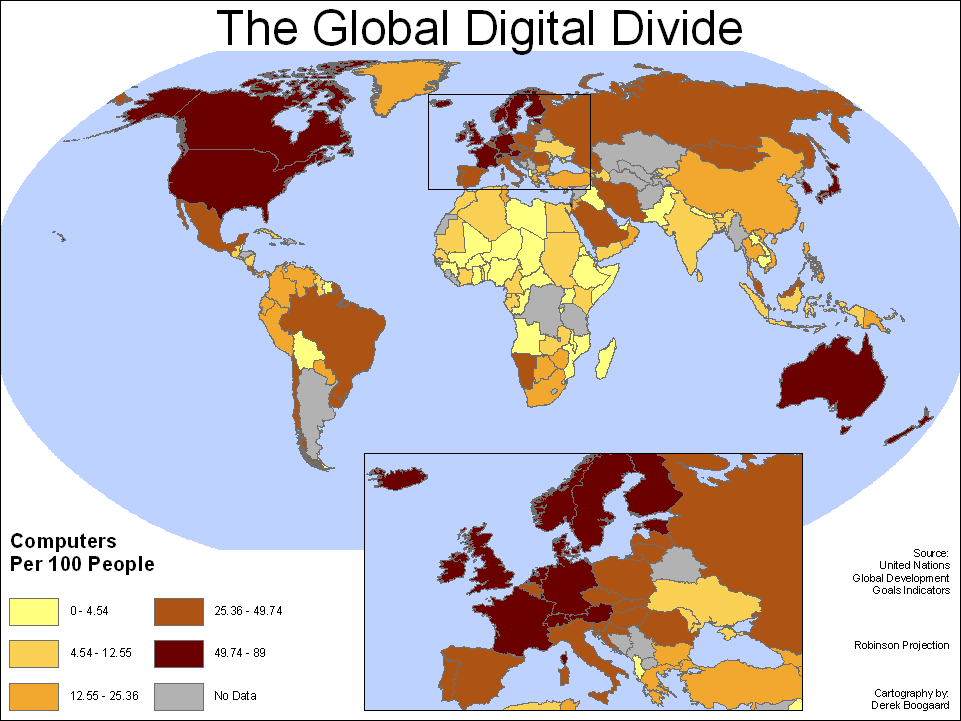
The global digital divide: Computers per 100 people

- Global issues (category), List of global issues
- Climate justice
- Economic inequality
- Fair trade
- Forced migration
- Global dimming
- Human overpopulation
- Human trafficking
- Illicit financial flows
- Invasive species
- Investor-state dispute settlement
- Global digital divide
- Global justice
- Migrant sex work
- North–South divide
- Ozone depletion
- Peace
- Race to the bottom
- Transnational organized crime
- Water issues in developing countries
- Water scarcity
- World hunger and malnutrition
- Westernization

== By location ==
- Globalization by location (category)
- Globalisation in India
  - Economic liberalisation in India
- Globalization in China
- Globalization and women in China
- Middle East and globalization

== Categories about globalization-related organizations ==
- International organizations (category)
  - International environmental organizations (category)
  - Global policy organizations (category)
    - Intergovernmental organizations
    - International non-profit organizations
  - Global workforce and labor organizations (category)
  - International medical and health organizations (category)

== Globalization-related lists ==
- Lists of environmental topics (category)
- Lists of political parties by United Nations geoscheme (category)
- 2009 flu pandemic by country
- International athletics championships and games
- List of demonstrations against corporate globalization
- List of epidemics
- List of free trade agreements
- List of global sustainability statistics
- List of globalization-related indices
- List of globalization-related journals
- List of human rights organisations
- List of intergovernmental organizations
- List of international rankings
- List of Occupy movement protest locations
- Lists of ecoregions by country
- Lists of endangered languages
- The Superclass List
- World economy – various embedded lists and indicators

== Works about globalization ==
- Works about globalization (category)
- Books about globalization (category)
- Documentary films about globalization (category)
- Serials about globalization (category)
  - List of globalization-related journals

== Persons influential in globalization ==
- Writers about globalization (category)
  - Category:Anti-globalization writers
  - Category:World system scholars

== See also ==
- Civilizing mission
- Columbian Exchange
- Development criticism
- Global civics
- Great Transition
- Interdependence
- Jet Age
- Lisbon Strategy
- Military globalization
- Technocapitalism
- Transnational cinema
- Transnational citizenship
- Triadization
- Vermeer's Hat
- United Nations Millennium Declaration
- Washington Consensus
