= Division of labour =

Separation of tasks in any system so that participants may specialise

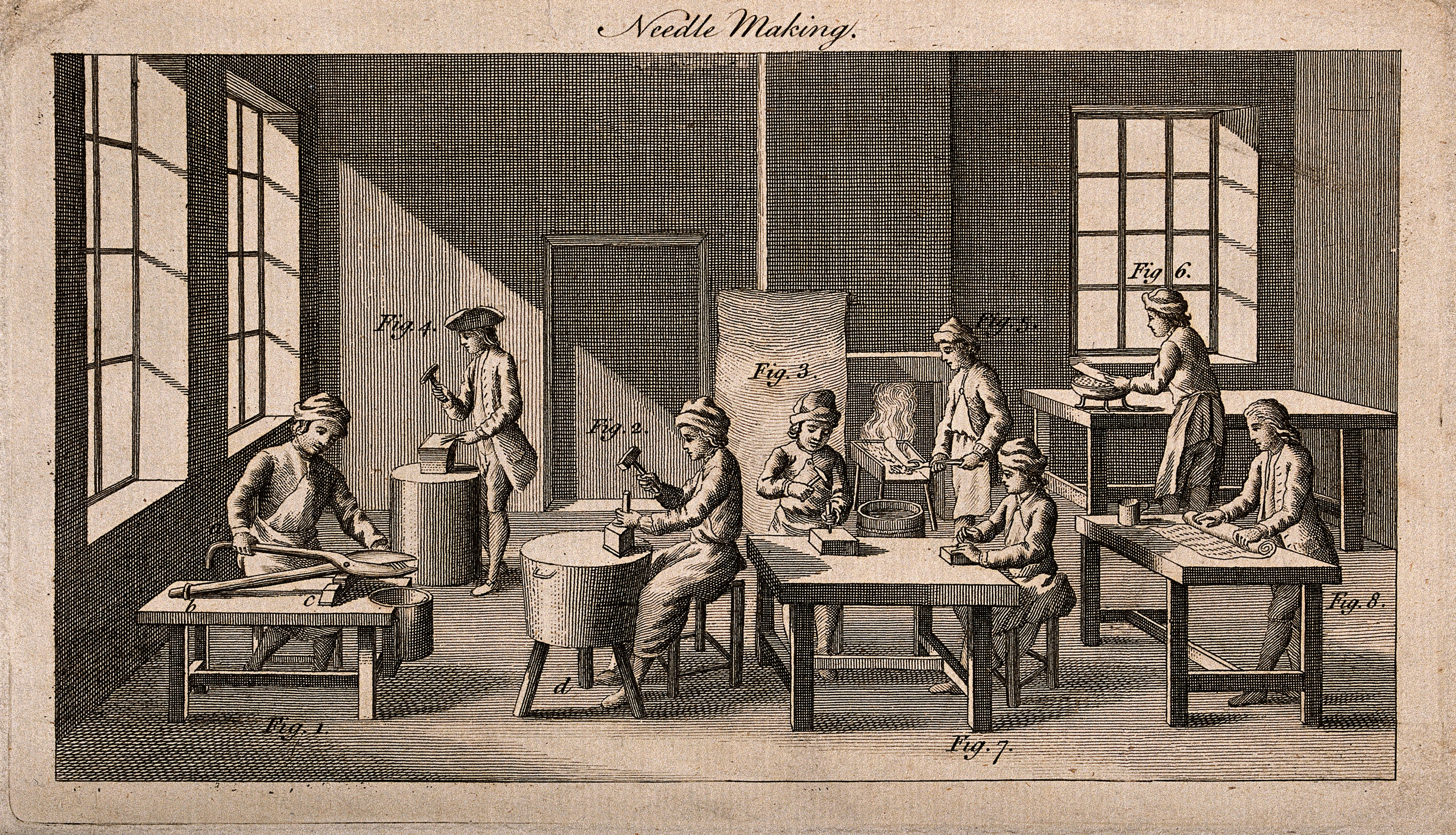
Eight steps in the manufacture of sewing needles

The division of labour is the separation of the tasks in any economic system or organisation so that participants may specialise (specialisation). Individuals, organisations, and nations are endowed with, or acquire, specialised capabilities and either form combinations or trade to take advantage of others' capabilities. Specialised capabilities may include equipment, natural resources, and skills. Training and the integration of equipment and other assets are often important. For example, an individual may specialise by acquiring tools and the skills to use them effectively, just as an organisation may specialise by acquiring specialised equipment and hiring or training skilled operators. The division of labour is the motive for trade and the source of economic interdependence.

An increasing division of labour is associated with the growth of total output and trade, the rise of capitalism, and the increasing complexity of industrialised processes. The concept and implementation of division of labour has been observed in ancient Sumerian (Mesopotamian) culture, where assignment of jobs in some cities coincided with an increase in trade and economic interdependence. Division of labour generally increases both overall economic productivity.

After the Neolithic Revolution, pastoralism and agriculture led to more reliable and abundant food supplies, which increased the population and spurred the specialisation of labour, including the emergence of new classes of artisans and warriors, as well as the development of elites. This specialisation was furthered by the process of industrialisation, and Industrial Revolution-era factories. Accordingly, many classical economists as well as some mechanical engineers, such as Charles Babbage, were proponents of the division of labour. Also, having lower-paid but more productive unskilled workers perform single or limited tasks eliminated and replaced the long training period required for artisans.

== Pre-modern theories ==
=== Plato ===
In Plato's Republic, the origin of the state lies in the natural inequality of humanity, which is embodied in the division of labour:

Well then, how will our state supply these needs? It will need a farmer, a builder, and a weaver, and also, I think, a shoemaker and one or two others to provide for our bodily needs. So that the minimum state would consist of four or five men....

— Republic (Penguin Classics ed.), p. 103

Silvermintz (2010) noted that "Historians of economic thought credit Plato, primarily on account of arguments advanced in his Republic, as an early proponent of the division of labour." Notwithstanding this, Silvermintz argues that "While Plato recognises both the economic and political benefits of the division of labour, he ultimately critiques this form of economic arrangement insofar as it hinders the individual from ordering his own soul by cultivating acquisitive motives over prudence and reason."

=== Xenophon ===
Xenophon, in the 4th century BC, makes a passing reference to division of labour in his Cyropaedia (a.k.a. Education of Cyrus).

Just as the various trades are most highly developed in large cities, in the same way food at the palace is prepared in a far superior manner. In small towns the same man makes couches, doors, ploughs and tables, and often he even builds houses, and still he is thankful if only he can find enough work to support himself. And it is impossible for a man of many trades to do all of them well. In large cities, however, because many make demands on each trade, one alone is enough to support a man, and often less than one: for instance one man makes shoes for men, another for women, there are places even where one man earns a living just by mending shoes, another by cutting them out, another just by sewing the uppers together, while there is another who performs none of these operations but assembles the parts. Of necessity, he who pursues a very specialised task will do it best.

=== Augustine of Hippo ===
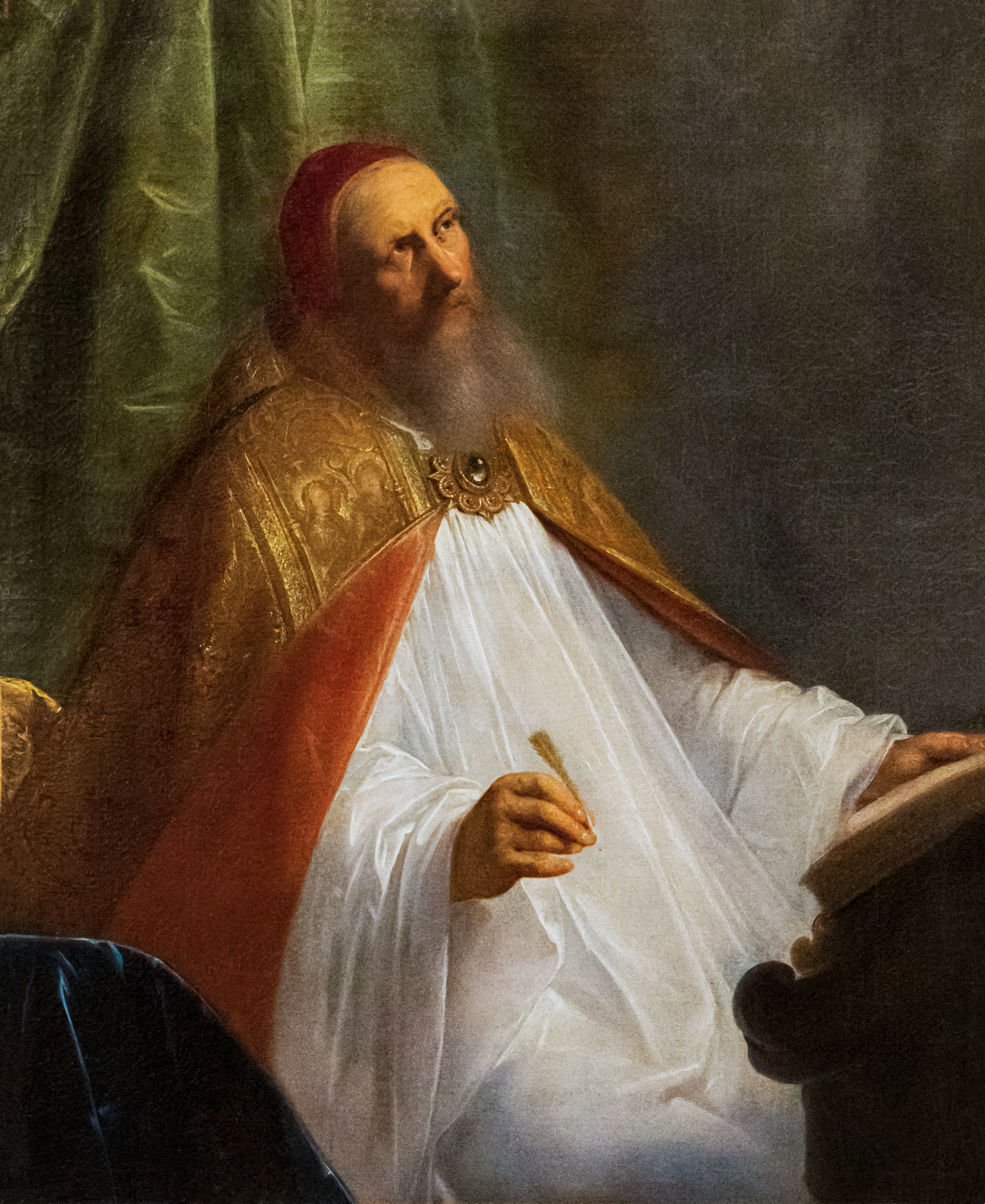
Painting of Augustine of Hippo by Pieter de Grebber

A simile used by Augustine of Hippo shows that the division of labour was practised and understood in late Imperial Rome. In a brief passage of his The City of God, Augustine seems to be aware of the role of different social layers in the production of goods, like household (familiae), corporations (collegia), and the state.

…like workmen in the street of the silversmiths, where one vessel, in order that it may go out perfect, passes through the hands of many, when it might have been finished by one perfect workman. But the only reason why the combined skill of many workmen was thought necessary, was, that it is better that each part of an art should be learned by a special workman, which can be done speedily and easily, than that they should all be compelled to be perfect in one art throughout all its parts, which they could only attain slowly and with difficulty.

— The City of God (tr. Marcus Dods), VII.4

=== Medieval Muslim scholars ===
Multiple medieval Persian scholars discussed the division of labour. They considered the division of labour among household members, among members of society, and among nations. For Nasir al-Din al-Tusi and al-Ghazali, the division of labour was necessary and useful. The similarity of the examples provided by these scholars with those provided by Adam Smith (such as al-Ghazali's needle factory and Tusi's claim that exchange, and by extension the division of labour, are the consequences of the human reasoning capability and that no animals have been observed to exchange one bone for another) led some scholars to conjecture that the medieval Persian scholarship influenced Smith.

== Modern theories ==
=== William Petty ===
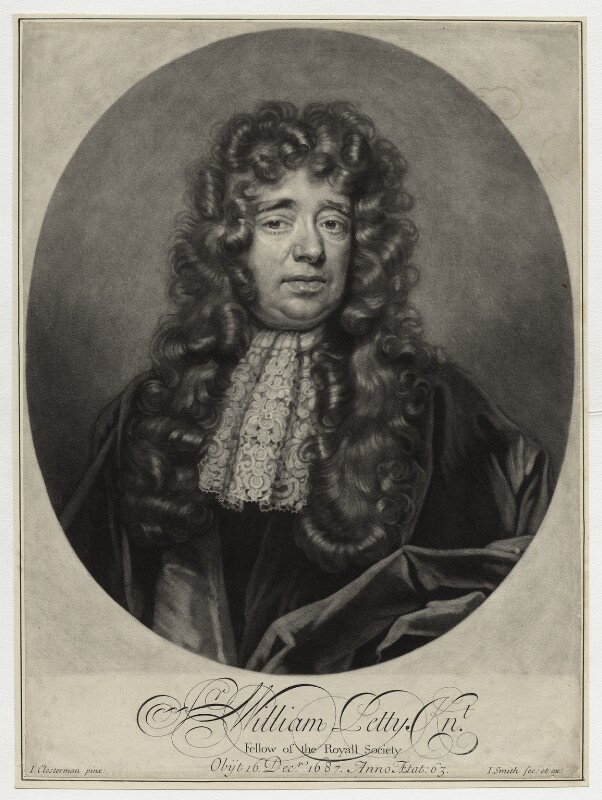
Sir William Petty

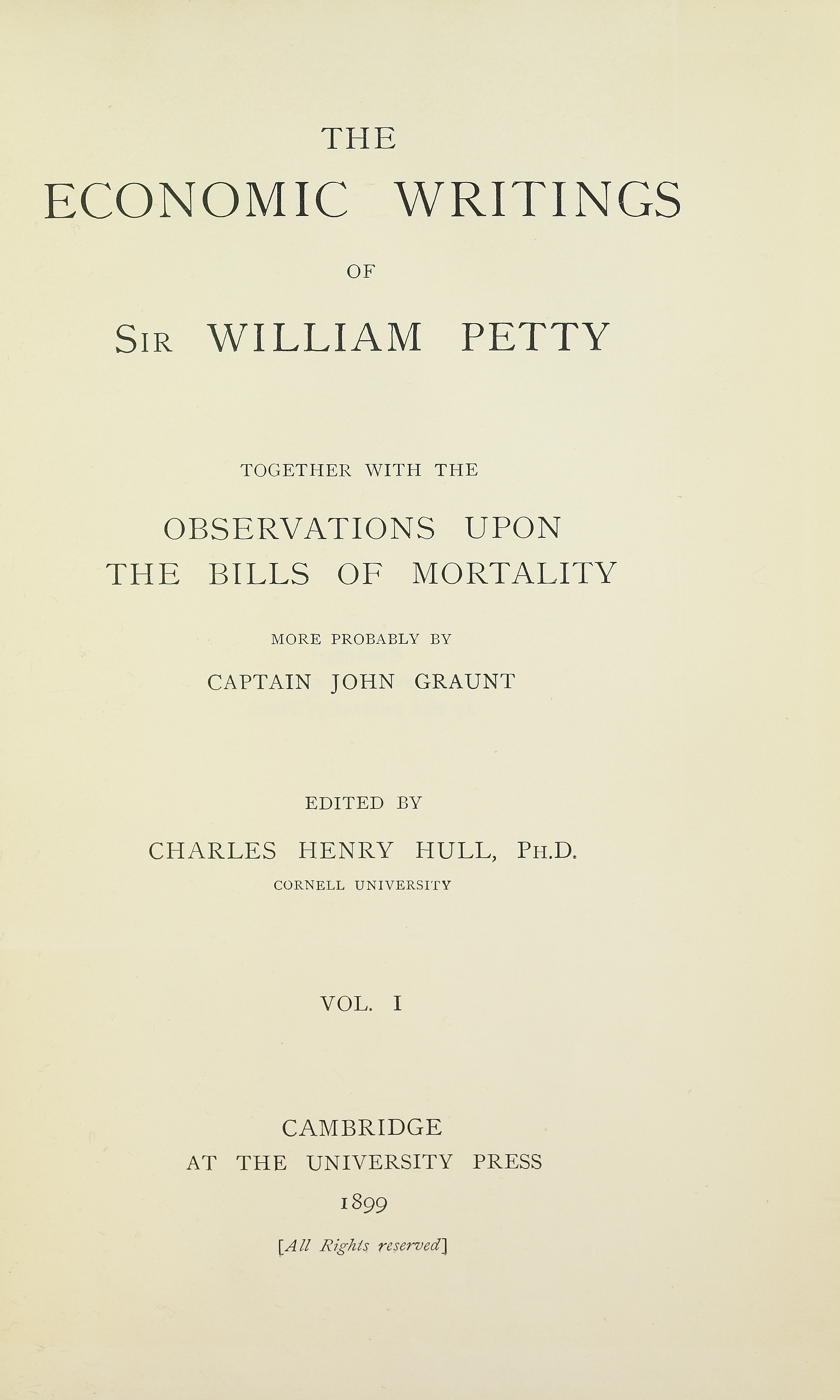
Petty - Economic Writings, 1899

Sir William Petty was the first modern writer to take note of the division of labour, showing its worth in existence and usefulness in Dutch shipyards. Classically, the workers in a shipyard would build ships as units, finishing one before starting another. But the Dutch had it organised with several teams, each doing the same tasks for successive ships. People with a particular task to do must have discovered new methods that were only later observed and justified by writers on political economy.

Petty also applied the principle to his survey of Ireland. His breakthrough was to divide the work so that people could do large parts with no extensive training.

=== Bernard de Mandeville ===
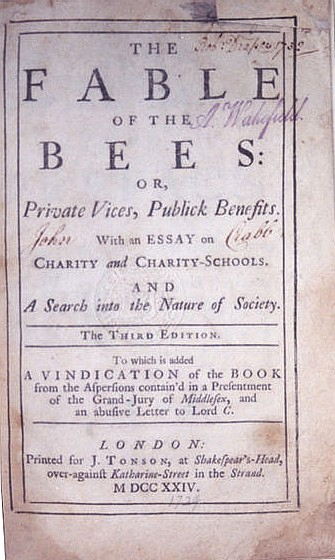
Fable of the Bees by Bernard Mandeville

Bernard de Mandeville discussed the matter in the second volume of The Fable of the Bees (1714). This elaborates on many of the matters raised in the original poem about a 'Grumbling Hive'. He says:

But if one will wholly apply himself to the making of Bows and Arrows, whilst another provides Food, a third builds Huts, a fourth makes Garments, and a fifth Utensils, they not only become useful to one another, but the Callings and Employments themselves will in the same Number of Years receive much greater Improvements, than if all had been promiscuously followed by every one of the Five.

=== David Hume ===
When every individual person labors apart, and only for himself, his force is too small to execute any considerable work; his labor being employed in supplying all his different necessities, he never attains a perfection in any particular art; and as his force and success are not at all times equal, the least failure in either of these particulars must be attended with inevitable ruin and misery. Society provides a remedy for these three inconveniences. By the conjunction of forces, our power is augmented: By the partition of employments, our ability increases: And by mutual succor we are less exposed to fortune and accidents. 'Tis by this additional force, ability, and security, that society becomes advantageous.

- David Hume, A Treatise on Human Nature

=== Henri-Louis Duhamel du Monceau ===
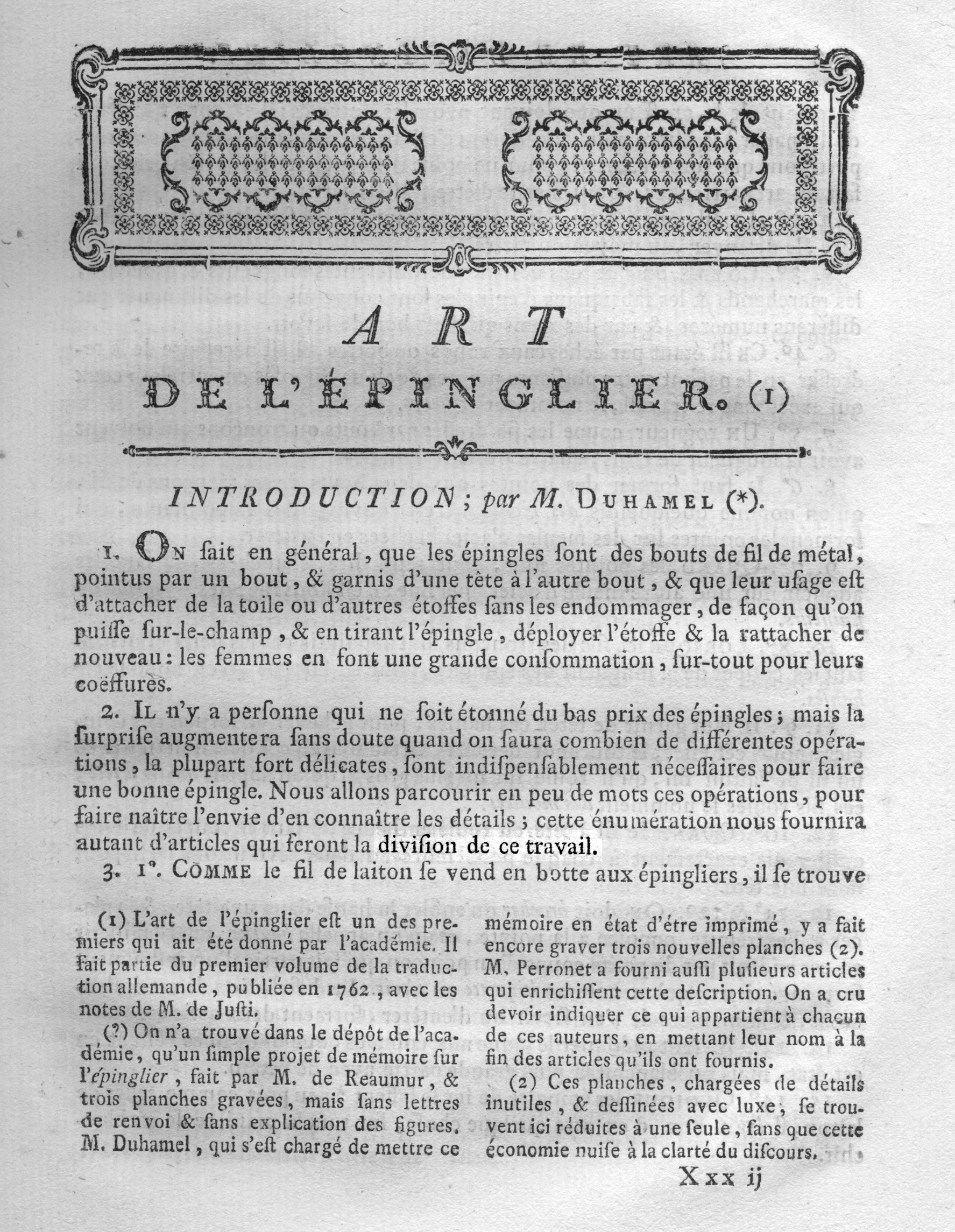
Facsimile of the first page of du Monceau's introduction to Art de l'Épinglier, with "division de ce travail" highlighted

In his introduction to The Art of the Pin-Maker (Art de l'Épinglier, 1761), Henri-Louis Duhamel du Monceau writes about the "division of this work":

There is nobody who isn't surprised of the small price of pins; but we shall be even more surprised, when we know how many different operations, most of them very delicate, are mandatory to make a good pin. We are going to go through these operations in a few words to stimulate the curiosity to know their detail; this enumeration will supply as many articles which will make the division of this work.… The first operation is to have brass go through the drawing plate to calibrate it.…

By "division of this work," du Monceau is referring to the subdivisions of the text describing the various trades involved in the pin-making activity; this can also be described as a division of labour.

=== Adam Smith ===
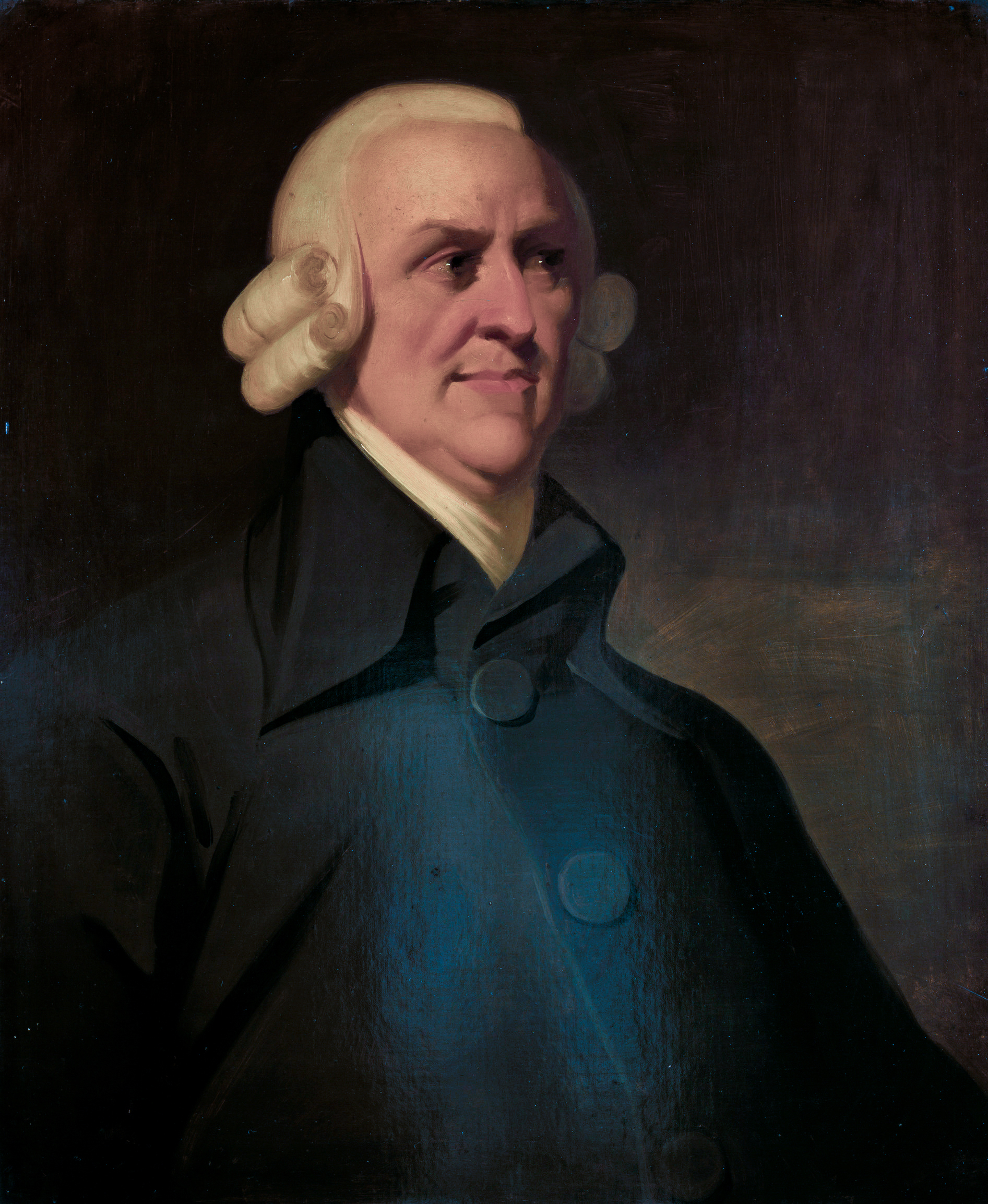
Adam Smith portrait

In the first sentence of An Inquiry into the Nature and Causes of the Wealth of Nations (1776), Adam Smith foresaw the essence of industrialism by determining that division of labour represents a substantial increase in productivity. Like du Monceau, he took the making of pins as his example.

Unlike Plato, Smith famously argued that the difference between a street porter and a philosopher was as much a consequence of the division of labour as its cause. Therefore, while for Plato the level of specialisation, determined by the division of labour, was externally imposed, for Smith it was the dynamic engine of economic progress. However, in a further chapter of the same book, Smith criticised the division of labour, saying that it makes man "as stupid and ignorant as it is possible for a human creature to become" and that it can lead to "the almost entire corruption and degeneracy of the great body of the people.…unless government takes some pains to prevent it." The contradiction has led to some debate over Smith's opinion of the division of labour. Alexis de Tocqueville agreed with Smith: "Nothing tends to materialize man, and to deprive his work of the faintest trace of mind, more than extreme division of labor." Adam Ferguson shared similar views to Smith, though he was generally more negative.

The specialisation and concentration of the workers on their single subtasks often leads to greater skill and greater productivity on their particular subtasks than would be achieved by the same number of workers each carrying out the original broad task, in part due to increased quality of production, but more importantly because of increased efficiency of production, leading to a higher nominal output of units produced per time unit. Smith uses the example of a production capability of an individual pin maker compared to a manufacturing business that employed 10 men:

One man draws out the wire; another straights it; a third cuts it; a fourth points it; a fifth grinds it at the top for receiving the head; to make the head requires two or three distinct operations; to put it on is a peculiar business; to whiten the pins is another; it is even a trade by itself to put them into the paper; and the important business of making a pin is, in this manner, divided into about eighteen distinct operations, which, in some manufactories, are all performed by distinct hands, though in others the same man will sometimes perform two or three of them. I have seen a small manufactory of this kind, where ten men only were employed, and where some of them consequently performed two or three distinct operations. But though they were very poor, and therefore but indifferently accommodated with the necessary machinery, they could, when they exerted themselves, make among them about twelve pounds of pins in a day. There are in a pound upwards of four thousand pins of a middling size. Those ten persons, therefore, could make among them upwards of forty-eight thousand pins in a day. Each person, therefore, making a tenth part of forty-eight thousand pins, might be considered as making four thousand eight hundred pins in a day. But if they had all wrought separately and independently, and without any of them having been educated to this peculiar business, they certainly could not each of them have made twenty, perhaps not one pin in a day.

Smith saw the importance of matching skills with equipment—usually in the context of an organisation. For example, pin makers were organised, with one making the head and another the body, each using different equipment. Similarly, he emphasised that a large number of skills, used in cooperation and with suitable equipment, were required to build a ship.

In modern economic discussion, the term human capital would be used. Smith's insight suggests that the huge increases in productivity obtainable from technology or technological progress are possible because human and physical capital are matched, usually in an organisation. See also a short discussion of Adam Smith's theory in the context of business processes. Babbage wrote a seminal work, On the Economy of Machinery and Manufactures, analysing perhaps for the first time the division of labour in factories.

=== Immanuel Kant ===
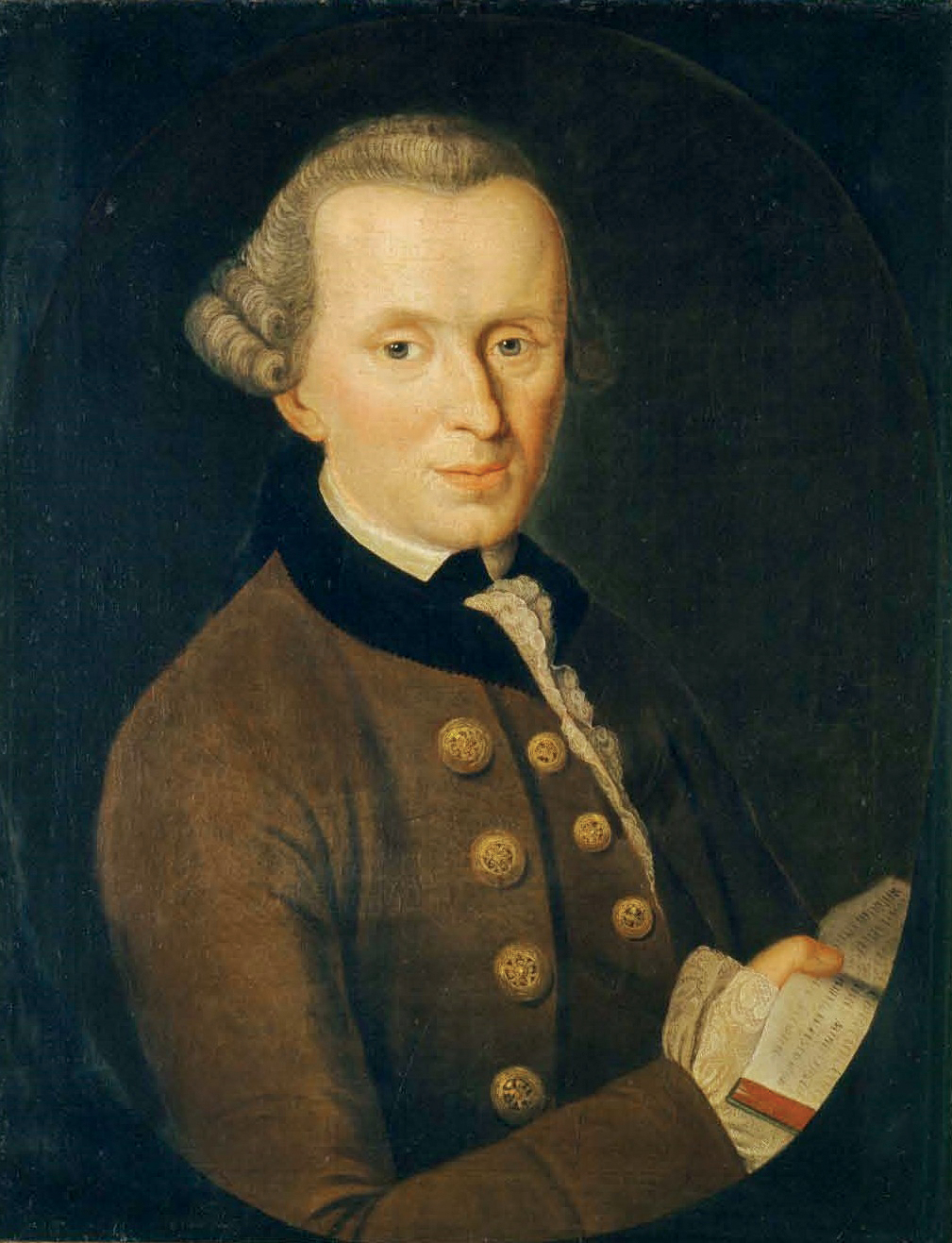
Kant

In the Groundwork of the Metaphysics of Morals (1785), Immanuel Kant notes the value of the division of labour:

All crafts, trades and arts have profited from the division of labour; for when each worker sticks to one particular kind of work that needs to be handled differently from all the others, he can do it better and more easily than when one person does everything. Where work is not thus differentiated and divided, where everyone is a jack-of-all-trades, the crafts remain at an utterly primitive level.

=== Karl Marx ===
Marx argued that increasing specialisation may also lead to workers with poorer overall skills and reduced enthusiasm for their work. He described the process as alienation: workers become increasingly specialised, and work becomes repetitive, eventually leading to complete alienation from the process of production. The worker then becomes "depressed spiritually and physically to the condition of a machine."

Additionally, Marx argued that the division of labour creates less-skilled workers. As work becomes more specialised, less training is needed for each specific job, and the workforce overall is less skilled than it would be if one worker did one job entirely.

Among Marx's theoretical contributions is his sharp distinction between the economic and the social division of labour. That is, some forms of labour co-operation are purely due to "technical necessity", but others are a result of a "social control" function related to a class and status hierarchy. If these two divisions are conflated, it might appear as though the existing division of labour is technically inevitable and immutable, rather than (in good part) socially constructed and influenced by power relationships. He also argues that in a communist society, the division of labour is transcended, meaning that balanced human development occurs where people fully express their nature in the variety of creative work that they do.

=== Henry David Thoreau and Ralph Waldo Emerson ===
Henry David Thoreau criticised the division of labour in Walden (1854), on the basis that it removes people from a sense of connectedness with society and with the world at large, including nature. He claimed that the average man in a civilised society is, in practice, less wealthy than one in a "savage" society. The answer he gave was that self-sufficiency was enough to cover one's basic needs.

Thoreau's friend and mentor, Ralph Waldo Emerson, criticised the division of labour in his "The American Scholar" speech: a well-informed, holistic citizenry is vital to the spiritual and physical health of the country.

=== Émile Durkheim ===
In his seminal work, The Division of Labor in Society, Émile Durkheim observes that the division of labour appears in all societies and positively correlates with societal advancement, as it increases with societal progress.

Durkheim arrived at the same conclusion regarding the positive effects of the division of labour as his theoretical predecessor, Adam Smith. In The Wealth of Nations, Smith observes that the division of labour results in "a proportionable increase of the productive powers of labor." While they shared this belief, Durkheim believed the division of labour applied to all "biological organisms generally"; Smith believed this law applied "only to human societies." This difference may result from the influence of Charles Darwin's On the Origin of Species on Durkheim's writings. For example, Durkheim observed an apparent relationship between "the functional specialisation of the parts of an organism" and "the extent of that organism's evolutionary development," which he believed "extended the scope of the division of labour so as to make its origins contemporaneous with the origins of life itself…implying that its conditions must be found in the essential properties of all organised matter."

Since Durkheim's division of labour applied to all organisms, he considered it a "natural law"; he worked to determine whether it should be embraced or resisted by first analysing its functions. Durkheim hypothesised that the division of labour fosters social solidarity, yielding "a wholly moral phenomenon" that ensures "mutual relationships" among individuals.

Émile Durkheim

As social solidarity cannot be directly quantified, Durkheim indirectly studies solidarity by "classify[ing] the different types of law to find...the different types of social solidarity which correspond to it." Durkheim categorises:

- criminal laws and their respective punishments as promoting mechanical solidarity, a sense of unity resulting from individuals engaging in similar work who hold shared backgrounds, traditions, and values; and
- civil laws as promoting organic solidarity, a society in which individuals engage in different kinds of work that benefit society and other individuals.

Durkheim believes that organic solidarity prevails in more advanced societies, while mechanical solidarity typifies less developed societies. He explains that in societies with more mechanical solidarity, the diversity and division of labour are much less, so individuals have a similar worldview. Similarly, Durkheim opines that in societies with more organic solidarity, the diversity of occupations is greater; individuals depend on each other more, resulting in greater benefits to society as a whole. Durkheim's work enabled social science to progress more efficiently "in…the understanding of human social behavior."

=== Ludwig von Mises ===
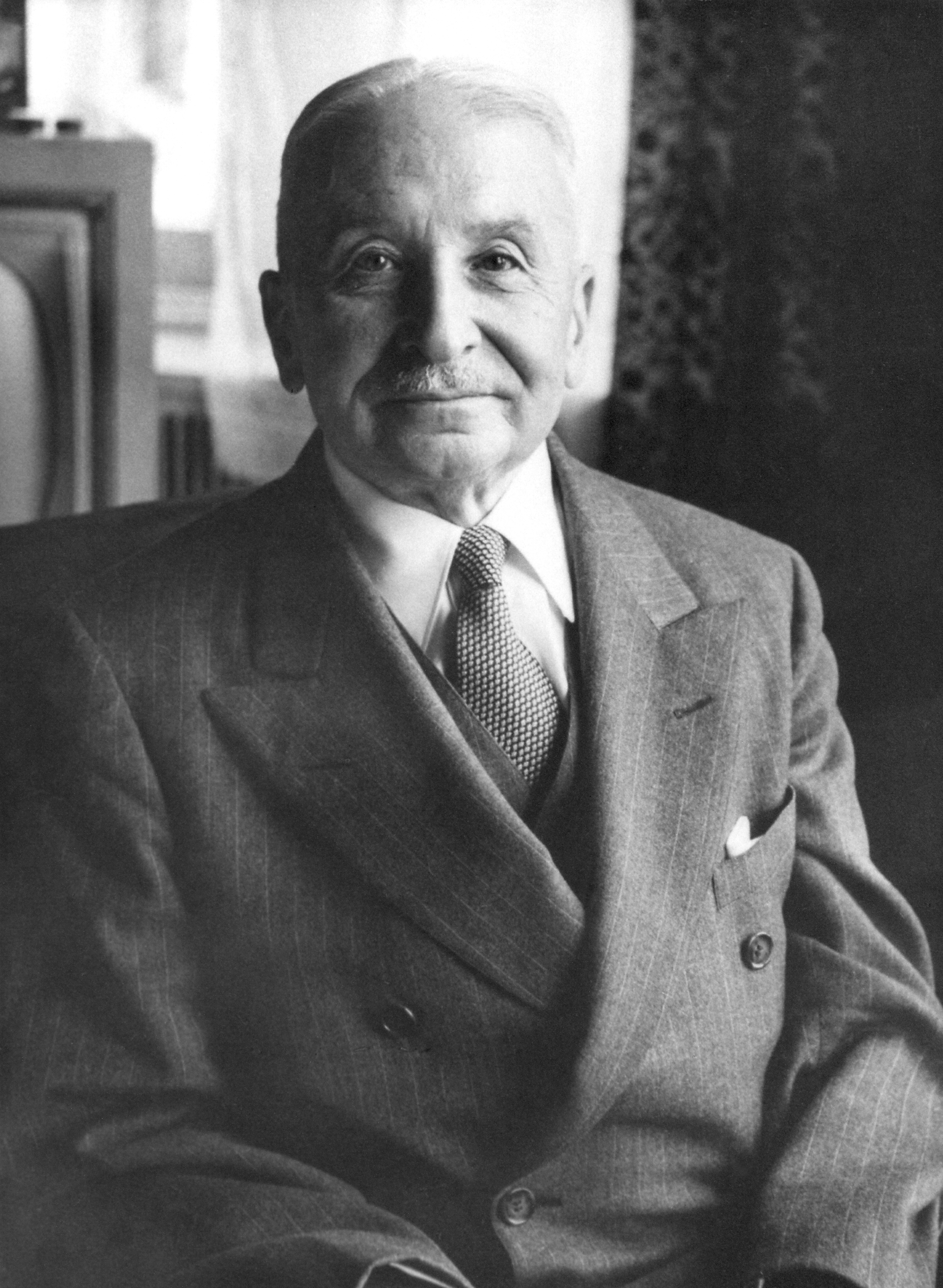
Ludwig von Mises

Marx's theories, including his criticisms of the division of labour, have been criticised by the Austrian economists, notably Ludwig von Mises. The primary argument is that the economic gains from the division of labour far outweigh the costs, thereby supporting the thesis that it leads to cost efficiencies. It is argued that it is entirely possible to achieve balanced human development within capitalism, and that alienation is downplayed as mere romantic fiction.

According to Mises, the idea has given rise to the concept of mechanisation, in which a specific task is performed by a mechanical device rather than by an individual labourer. This method of production is significantly more effective in both yield and cost-effectiveness, and utilises the division of labour to the fullest extent possible. Mises saw the very idea of a task being performed by a specialised mechanical device as being the greatest achievement of the division of labour.

=== Friedrich A. Hayek ===
In "The Use of Knowledge in Society", Friedrich A. Hayek states:

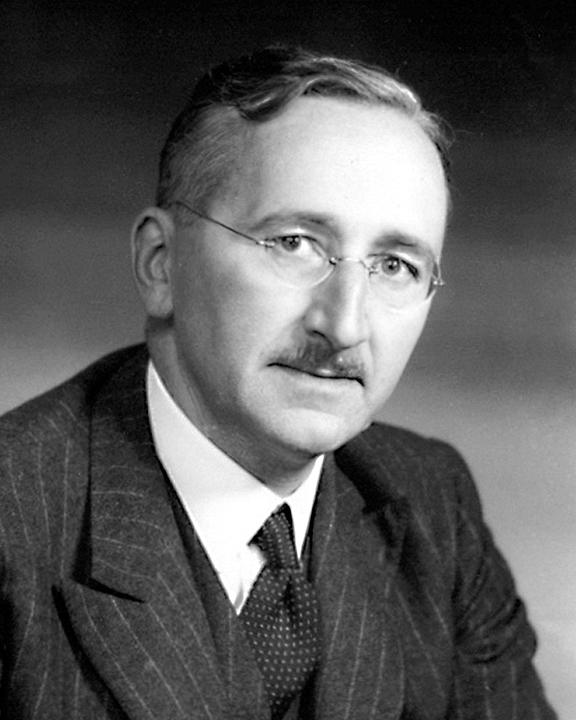
Friedrich Hayek portrait

The price system is just one of those formations which man has learned to use (though he is still very far from having learned to make the best use of it) after he had stumbled upon it without understanding it. Through it not only a division of labour but also a coordinated utilisation of resources based on an equally divided knowledge has become possible. The people who like to deride any suggestion that this may so usually distort the argument by insinuating that it asserts that by some miracle just that sort of system has spontaneously grown up which is best suited to modern civilisation. It is the other way round: man has been able to develop that division of labour on which our civilisation is based because he happened to stumble upon a method which made it possible. Had he not done so, he might still have developed some other, altogether different, type of civilisation, something like the "state" of the termite ants, or some other altogether unimaginable type.

== Globalisation and global division of labour ==
The issue reaches its broadest scope in the controversies about globalisation, which is often interpreted as a euphemism for the expansion of international trade based on comparative advantage. This would mean that countries specialise in the work they can do at the lowest relative cost, measured by the opportunity cost of not using resources for other work, relative to the opportunity costs faced by other countries. Critics, however, allege that international specialisation cannot be explained sufficiently in terms of "the work nations do best"; rather, this specialisation is guided more by commercial criteria, which favour some countries over others.

The OECD advised in June 2005 that:

Efficient policies to encourage employment and combat unemployment are essential if countries are to reap the full benefits of globalisation and avoid a backlash against open trade... Job losses in some sectors, along with new job opportunities in other sectors, are an inevitable accompaniment of the process of globalisation... The challenge is to ensure that the adjustment process involved in matching available workers with new job openings works as smoothly as possible.

Few studies have examined the global division of labour. Information can be drawn from ILO and national statistical offices. In one study, Deon Filmer estimated that 2.474 billion people participated in the global non-domestic labour force in the mid-1990s. Of these:

- around 15%, or 379 million people, worked in industry;
- a third, or 800 million, worked in services and
- over 40%, or 1,074 million, in agriculture.

The majority of workers in industry and services were wage and salary earners—58 per cent of the industrial workforce and 65 per cent of the services workforce. But a large portion was self-employed or involved in family labour. Filmer suggests the total of employees worldwide in the 1990s was about 880 million, compared with around a billion working on their own account on the land (mainly peasants), and some 480 million working on their own account in industry and services. The 2007 ILO Global Employment Trends Report indicated that services have surpassed agriculture for the first time in human history:

In 2006 the service sector's share of global employment overtook agriculture for the first time, increasing from 39.5 to 40 per cent. Agriculture decreased from 39.7 per cent to 38.7 per cent. The industry sector accounted for 21.3 per cent of total employment.

== Contemporary theories ==
In the modern world, the specialists most preoccupied with theorising about the division of labour are those involved in management and organisation.

In general, in capitalist economies, such things are not decided consciously. Different people try different things, and that which is most effective cost-wise (produces the most and best output with the least input) will generally be adopted. Often, techniques that work in one place or time do not work as well elsewhere or at another time.

=== Styles of division of labour ===
Two styles of management that are seen in modern organisations are control and commitment:

1. Control management, the style of the past, is based on the principles of job specialisation and the division of labour. This is the assembly-line style of job specialisation, where employees are assigned a very narrow set of tasks or a single specific task.
2. Commitment division of labour, the style of the future, is oriented towards including employees and building internal commitment to accomplishing tasks. Tasks include more responsibility and are coordinated based on expertise rather than a formal position.

Job specialisation is advantageous in developing employee expertise in a field and boosting organisational production. However, disadvantages of job specialisation included limited employee skill, dependence on the entire department's fluency, and employee discontent with repetitive tasks.

=== Labour hierarchy ===
It is widely accepted among economists and social theorists that the division of labour is, to a great extent, inevitable within capitalist societies, simply because no one can do all tasks at once. Labour hierarchy is a very common feature of the modern capitalist workplace structure, and the way these hierarchies are structured can be influenced by a variety of different factors, including:

- Size: as organisations increase in size, there is a correlation in the rise of the division of labour.
- Cost: cost limits small organisations from dividing their labour responsibilities.
- Development of new technology: technological developments have led to a decrease in the amount of job specialisation in organisations, as new technology makes it easier for fewer employees to accomplish a variety of tasks and still enhance production. New technology has also helped streamline information flow between departments, reducing the feeling of departmental isolation.

It is often argued that the most equitable principle for allocating people within hierarchies is that of true (or proven) competence or ability. This concept of meritocracy could be read as an explanation or as a justification of why a division of labour is the way it is.

This claim, however, is often disputed by various sources, particularly:

- Marxists claim hierarchy is created to support the power structures in capitalist societies which maintain the capitalist class as the owner of the labour of workers, to exploit it. Anarchists often add to this analysis by defending that the presence of coercive hierarchy in any form is contrary to the values of liberty and equality.
- Anti-imperialists see the globalised labour hierarchy between first world and third world countries necessitated by companies (through unequal exchange) that create a labour aristocracy by exploiting the poverty of workers in the developing world, where wages are much lower. These increased profits enable these companies to pay higher wages and taxes in the developed world (which fund welfare in first-world countries), thus creating a working class satisfied with their standard of living and not inclined to revolution. This concept is further explored in dependency theory, notably by Samir Amin and Zak Cope.

== Limitations ==
Adam Smith famously said in The Wealth of Nations that the extent of the market limits the division of labour. This is because, through exchange, each person can specialise in their work and still have access to a wide range of goods and services. Hence, reductions in barriers to exchange lead to increases in the division of labour and so help to drive economic growth. Limitations to the division of labour have also been related to coordination and transportation costs.

There can be motivational advantages to a reduced division of labour (which has been termed ‘job enlargement’ and 'job enrichment'). Jobs that are too specialised in a narrow range of tasks are said to result in demotivation due to boredom and alienation. Hence, a Taylorist approach to work design contributed to the worsening of industrial relations.

There are also limitations to the division of labour (and the division of work) that result from workflow variations and uncertainties. These help to explain issues in modern work organisation, such as task consolidations in business process reengineering and the use of multi-skilled work teams. For instance, one stage of a production process may temporarily work at a slower pace, forcing other stages to slow down. One answer to this is to make some portion of resources mobile between stages so that those resources must be capable of undertaking a wider range of tasks. Another is to consolidate tasks so that they are undertaken sequentially by the same workers and other resources. Stocks between stages can also help to reduce the problem to some extent, but they are costly and can hamper quality control. Modern flexible manufacturing systems require both flexible machines and flexible workers.

In project-based work, the coordination of resources is a difficult issue for the project manager as project schedules are developed. Resulting resource bookings are based on estimates of task durations and so are subject to subsequent revisions. Again, consolidating tasks so that they are undertaken consecutively by the same resources, and having resources available that can be called on at short notice from other tasks, can help reduce such problems, though at the cost of reduced specialisation.

There are also advantages in a reduced division of labour where knowledge would otherwise have to be transferred between stages. For example, having a single person deal with a customer query means that only that one person has to be familiar with the customer's details. It is also likely to result in the query being handled faster by eliminating delays in passing it between people.

== Gendered division of labour ==
The clearest exposition of the principles of sexual division of labour across the full range of human societies can be summarised by a large number of logically complementary implicational constraints of the following form: if women of childbearing ages in a given community tend to do X (e.g., preparing soil for planting) they will also do Y (e.g., the planting); while for men the logical reversal in this example would be that if men plant, they will prepare the soil.

White, Brudner, and Burton's (1977) "Entailment Theory and Method: A Cross-Cultural Analysis of the Sexual Division of Labor", using statistical entailment analysis, shows that tasks more frequently chosen by women in these order relations are those more convenient in relation to child rearing. This type of finding has been replicated in a variety of studies, including those on modern industrial economies. These entailments do not restrict how much work for any given task could be done by men (e.g., in cooking) or by women (e.g., in clearing forests), but are only least-effort or role-consistent tendencies. To the extent that women clear forests for agriculture, for example, they tend to do the entire agricultural sequence of tasks on those clearings. In theory, these types of constraints could be removed by provisions of child care, but ethnographic examples are lacking.

== Industrial organisational psychology ==
Job satisfaction has been shown to improve when an employee is assigned a specific job. Students who have received PhDs in a chosen field later report greater job satisfaction than in their previous jobs. This can be attributed to their high levels of specialisation. The higher the training needed for the specialised job position, the higher the level of job satisfaction is as well, although many highly specialised jobs can be monotonous and produce high rates of burnout periodically.

== Disaggregated work ==
A job divided into elemental parts is sometimes called "disaggregated work". Workers specialising in particular parts of the job are called professionals. The workers doing a portion of a non-recurring work may be called contractors, freelancers, or temporary workers. Modern communication technologies, particularly the Internet, gave rise to the sharing economy, which is orchestrated by online marketplaces for various kinds of disaggregated work.

== See also ==
- Asset poverty
- Complex society
- Economic sector
- Economies of scale
- Family economy
- Fordism
- Identity performance
- Industrialisation
- Kyriarchy
- McDonaldization
- Mechanisation
- New international division of labour
- Newly industrialised country
- Precariat
- Precarious work
- Productive and unproductive labour
- Price system
- Role suction
- Surplus product
- Temporary work
- Urbanisation
- Winner and loser culture
