= Labor mobility =

Geographical and occupational movement of workers

Labor mobility or worker mobility is the geographical and occupational movement of workers. Impediments to mobility are easily divided into two distinct classes with one being personal and the other being systemic. Personal impediments include physical location, and physical and mental ability. The systemic impediments include educational opportunities as well as various laws and political contrivances and even barriers and hurdles arising from historical happenstance.

Increasing and maintaining a high level of labor mobility allows a more efficient allocation of resources and greater productivity.

== International labor mobility ==
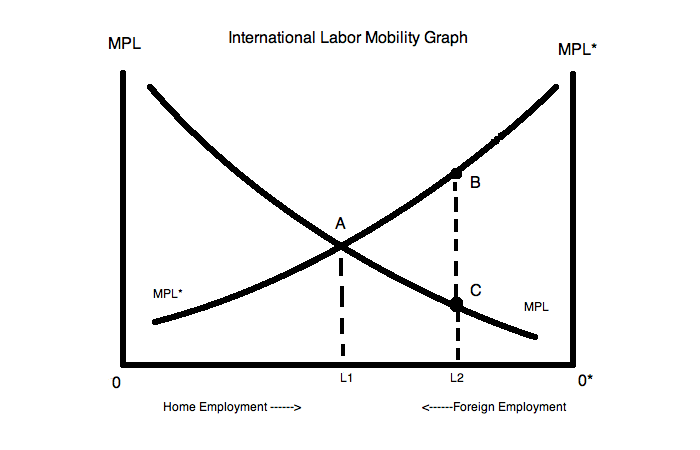
The change in real wage and workers' location where international labor mobility is allowed.

International labor mobility is the movement of workers between countries. It is an example of an international factor movement. The movement of laborers is based on a difference in resources between countries. According to economists, over time the migration of labor should have an equalizing effect on wages, with workers in the same industries garnering the same wage.

== Displaced labor mobility ==
In recent years, labor mobility pathways have been explored as a complementary solution for displaced populations. International organisations such as the International Organization for Migration (IOM) and the United Nations High Commissioner for Refugees (UNHCR) have examined how displaced people's skills can be matched with labor shortages in destination countries through regulated migration channels. Displaced Labor Mobility is often discussed within the broader framework of complementary pathways for refugee admission to destination countries.

== See also ==
- Relocation service
- Human resources
- Global mobility
