= Export-oriented employment =

Employment in multinational corporations' international industrial factories

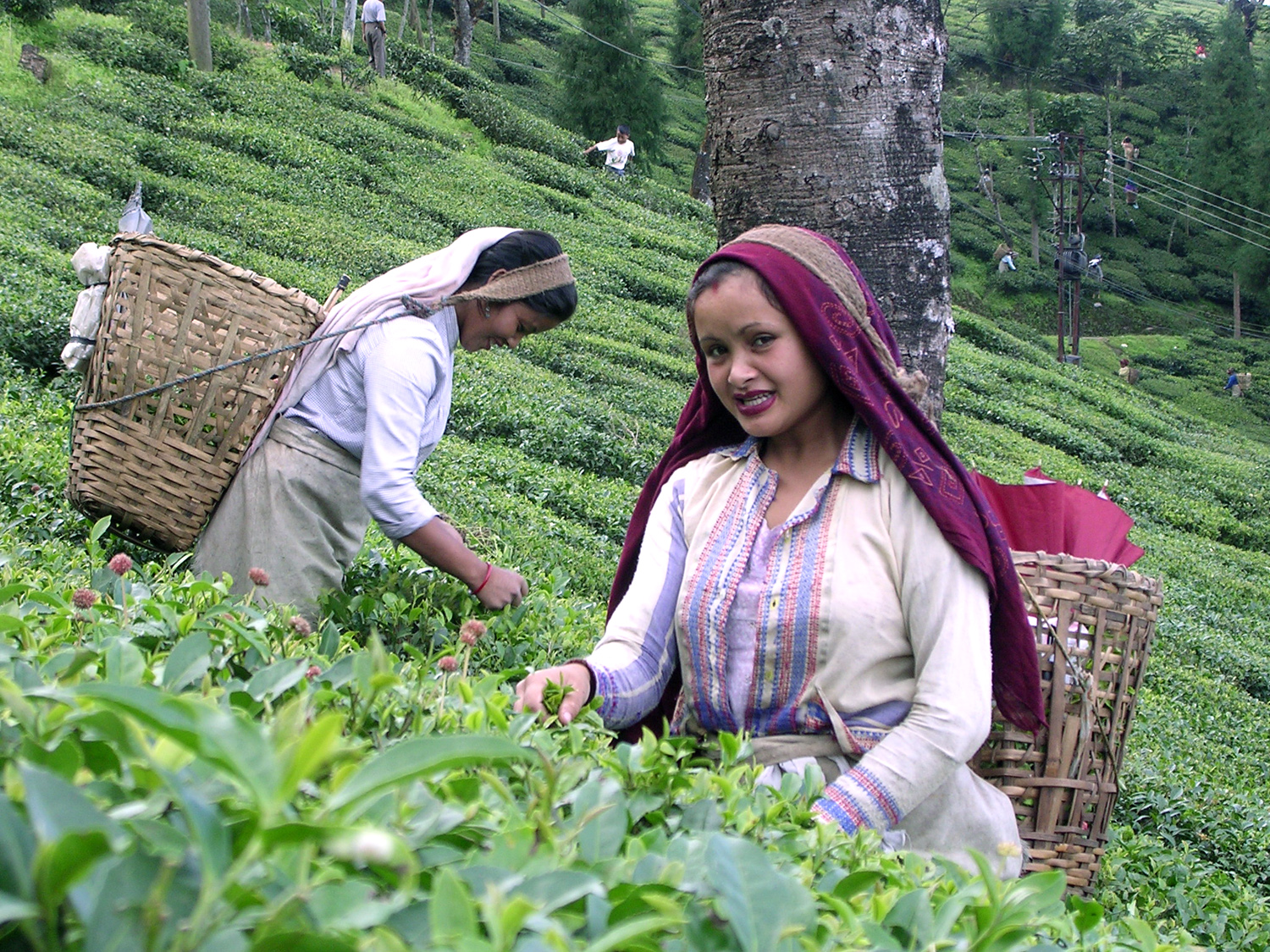
Darjeeling tea garden worker

Export-oriented employment refers to employment in multinational corporations' international industrial factories, usually located in developing countries. Such factories produce goods and services for sale in other countries. While these multinational producers have globally expanded women's access to employment, evidence suggests they do so by reinforcing traditional gender roles or creating new gender inequalities. Such gender inequities allow multinational firms to greater exploit profits per worker than they would otherwise due to the decreased labor cost. This decrease in the cost of labor comes as a result of the relegation of women to certain occupations. Studies show that in the quest for lower unit labor costs, export-oriented facilities create poor working conditions.

== History ==
Work in international factories has become an option for women in developing countries. This opportunity, which has increased since the latter part of the 1960s, represents the production of goods to be sold explicitly to more developed countries.

In the late 1950s and early 1960s, developing countries emerged as the sites to relocate labor-intensive manufacturing industries, as they were moved away from developed countries. This expansionism has forced developing countries to create and sell assembled products and other goods to more developed countries. Upon greater enhancement, developing countries were able to bolster their industrialized processes by swapping imported goods in favor of goods produced domestically. However, within the last 40 years this process eroded due in part to technological development, changes in regulation, and higher employment costs in more developed countries. Additionally, international trade has expanded in a distinct manner that is linked to manufacturing processes.

From the 1970s forward, the global marketplace and the makeup of the labor force has had transformations by way of technological innovation, work structure, and new forms of controlling labor. Because of changes in the wider labor market, women have joined the labor force in greater numbers and tended to remain a part of the force. Moreover, many male employees have often been moved to less desirable jobs, if not placed outside of the labor market entirely. Additionally, those characteristics commonly related to female employment such as temporary arrangements, low wages, and job instability have risen. Moreover, these patterns have increased vis-a-vis characteristics identified with male labor, such as unionization and job security. Consequently, the expansion of export-oriented employment is a major contributor to what some have called, "the global feminization of labor" in the post-1980 period.

Currently one of the most significant examples of export-oriented employment is the Bangladesh textile industry. By 2013, about 4 million people, mostly women, worked in Bangladesh's $19 billion-a-year industry, export-oriented ready-made garment (RMG) industry. Sixty percent of the export contracts of western brands are with European buyers and about forty percent with American buyers.

== Women as the preferred labor force ==
Gender roles vary by society, but are often based in social ideas that women have different natural abilities and a more suitable temperament for certain work as compared to men. Typically, women have been the preferred labor force in export-oriented factories because they allow for lower unit labor costs. Additionally, women are often deemed more physically dexterous and are regarded as more tempered in reference to their personality. As a result of which, some have argued that women are stereotyped as being better able to complete tasks that are mundane.

There is evidence to support the argument that women receive such perceived traits or skills in a non-formal and independent setting. However, as a result of which, women's skills employed in a factory setting are likely to be viewed as less valuable compared to other skill sets. Thus, women can be described as being relegated to an inferior status because their abilities are not equally valued. Finally, while women in factory settings are often unfairly demoted and forced into submissive roles, they are aware of their perceived lower status and do not accept it.

Dominguez et al. (2010) note that in processing centers located in Mexico, employers favored hiring married females. In this context, Dominguez et al. note that married women were seen as more dependable and as a result of which, better employees. The same authors also note that employers put forth that such a system allowed the families of those hired to be better supported. However, Dominguez et al. claim such a stance by employers is a decision that relegates women to a specific role based on gender and allows for greater control of the given workers.

In a 2003 analysis of a Chinese electronics producer, Pun Ngai found that surveyed workers sought employment by migrating from a variety of areas across the country and generally were employed for a period that was less than 36 months. The workers surveyed by Ngai were largely in their early 20s and nearly three-quarters were female.

== Working conditions ==
=== Wage levels ===
In an examination of Chinese factories producing electronic goods for the west, including Apple and Microsoft, reporting indicates that workers are often paid less than US$2 per hour.

In the latter part of 2011, weekly payments for minimum wage workers in Cambodia's garment industry totaled 8117 Riel. Despite the fact that workers have others who rely upon their wages, manufacturing entities are well aware that they do not provide sustainable wages. Moreover, for Cambodian garment manufacturers to remain competitive, factory owners must keep wages low. Creating higher wages poses risks for factory owners that other countries accepting export orders will usurp their place. However, despite the allure that factory jobs provide for rural workers, rapidly falling wages risk alienating this mass of people.

Beginning at the start of the millennium and ending in 2010, workers in Cambodia's garment sector have seen their inflation adjusted wages decrease by nearly 17%. These wages are expected to continue to fall almost twofold through the year of 2014.

=== Hours ===
In 2012, evidence that workers in Cambodia's garment sector were burdened by unreasonable overtime hours was found to be common place in factories monitored by "Better Factories Cambodia," a group originally designated to oversee and improve factory conditions. As product orders often ebb and flow, managers require extended hours from their employees. Additionally, managers can eliminate additional costs by imposing excessive overtime on fewer workers, versus giving a greater share of benefits to a larger population with less overtime.

In discussions with Cambodia's garment sector workers, many have noted that burdensome overtime was particularly strenuous, but also necessary because of falling wages. Moreover, workers in the industry have called for the option to choose when to engage in overtime hours, versus required overtime work delegated to them.

=== Control ===
Pun Ngai has analyzed labor systems in Chinese dormitories that are intertwined with production sites and labor. In this analysis, evidence is put forth that details how migrant laborers in export-processing areas have been forced into such residences that allow for complete worker control. This control comes from the dormitory grounds being secured by security guards that prevent worker exits. This structure is often rationalized as a benefit to the workers, whom the factory owners view as being in need of security and extra discipline.

Additionally, dormitories of this kind can house hundreds of workers, where as many as twenty workers may share a room. While such conditions can be detrimental to workers, it can also be a shared source of discomfort through which workers may more easily unite for common causes.

=== Safety concerns ===
In 2012, a fire erupted in a garment factory in Karachi, Pakistan that killed approximately 300 people. Facing imminent death, many workers leapt from upper levels of the factory, leading to many injuries as they landed. Furthermore, tools to fight fires at the factory were lacking, and fire exits had been tampered with or were non-existent.

In 2013, 2013 a garment factory in Bangladesh collapsed, killing at least 1000 people and injuring approximately 2500 others. A worker noted a blatant structural flaw before the collapse, however, factory management allowed work to continue.

In 2013 a shoe factory in Cambodia collapsed killing several people and injuring many others.

In a report released in 2013, researchers found that industrial Cambodian facilities overseen by "Better Factories Cambodia" had numerous issues related to workers' health and safety. Of the factories assessed, the majority had a lack of restroom sanitizing products, excessively high temperature levels, and no access to safe water for drinking.

Kalpona Akter, a former Bangladeshi child garment worker and industry activist, has described conditions where garment factory managers lock exit doors while workers are engaging in tasks. Akter notes that factory managers value the goods that are being produced instead of worker well-being.

== Activism ==
In 2005, students at a variety of universities in the United States engaged in protests against colleges that purchase goods created in the industrial apparel sector in order to sell with their personal namesakes. In their quest for better outcomes, some of the students in protest have urged universities to create special independent contracts with international apparel factories that require stringent oversight, as well as a promise to refrain from producing goods other than those created for the noted educational institution. Protesters also argue that because these industrial workers receive payments that are less than or equal to two percent of an item's selling price, the earnings for industrial workers should allotted based on prices in the area of which they work. While activists note that there is an increased cost for consumers, they set forth that in one example that this price change can be under one U.S. dollar in retail price.

Rachel Silvey has noted that efforts by college activists force local college administrators to make changes that have international effects. Such university protests challenge global neoliberal policies that are explicitly intertwined with current university policies.

In the export-oriented industry in Thailand, women make up the majority of those employed, and are often the most vitriolic objectors to workplace injustices. In defying conventional norms that portray women as passive, Mill describes incidents where Thai activists shaved their heads and threaten to write protest letters in their own blood.

In 2012 Aminul Islam, a Bangladeshi labor supporter, was found murdered. Highlighting the intensity of the struggle between laborers and owners, reports indicate that Islam was tortured prior to his death.

In 2014, workers employed in Cambodia's garment industry, who are predominantly female, protested against the government's current minimum wage level. Some participants in Cambodia's Garment Manufacturing Association responded to protests by noting that products manufactured in Cambodia would move elsewhere.

=== Unions and workers' rights ===
In Cambodian export factories, workers often face hardship in regards to participating in unionization efforts that differ from that of management philosophy. Workers have noted deliberate efforts by managers to dismantle union activities, that have often included threats or the initiation of violence.

Among other Asian countries, Bangladesh has extremely poor rights regarding unionization. There is evidence that this problem may be connected to, and exacerbated by, Bangladesh's reliance on exporting apparel goods in the past three decades. Highlighting the lack of collectivity, a mere 2 percent of employees were active in unions.

== Policies ==
In light of deteriorating labor market standards abroad, widespread attention and criticism has been leveled at overseas manufacturers in hopes of creating a minimum standard for labor practices that would afford workers rights related to unionization and freedom from workplace discrimination. Intertwined in this attention, critics have looked to connect such minimum standards to broader global trading treaties. This pairing, known as a "social clause", aims to force international trade bodies such as the World Trade Organization (WTO) to integrate seven core International Labour Organization (ILO) labour rights conventions into trade agreements and attach penalties to those that do not.

Advocacy on behalf of labour rights can often come via governments and private groups from the global north. In this regard, many entities may support such a theme because of personal economic interest or indignation toward unfair labor practices. Comparatively, lesser developed countries and private groups in those countries are often skeptical of such trade agreements as they view the implementation of labor rights policies as being designed to further enrich the global north.

Despite the precariousness found in export-oriented factories, research has indicated that women in developing countries are satisfied by the opportunity to have a formal factory job, compared to the limited informal ways of making money. This contentment on the part of women is created via the ability to garner greater independence as well as having increasing oversight within their homes.

In 1999, Cambodia and the United States entered into a trade agreement known as the U.S./Cambodia Bilateral Textile Trade Agreement. This agreement would initiate a program now known as "Better Factories Cambodia." With initial funding totaling $1.4 million, the program aimed to increase oversight by way of ILO employees in conjunction with bolstering the administrative abilities of the Cambodian government. While the program has yielded positive results in regard to minimum wages and equitable timely payments, there are recurrent problems in regards to safety and excessive overtime.

== See also ==
- Free Trade Zone
- Export-oriented industrialization
- Gender and development
- Global workforce
