= Social division of labor =

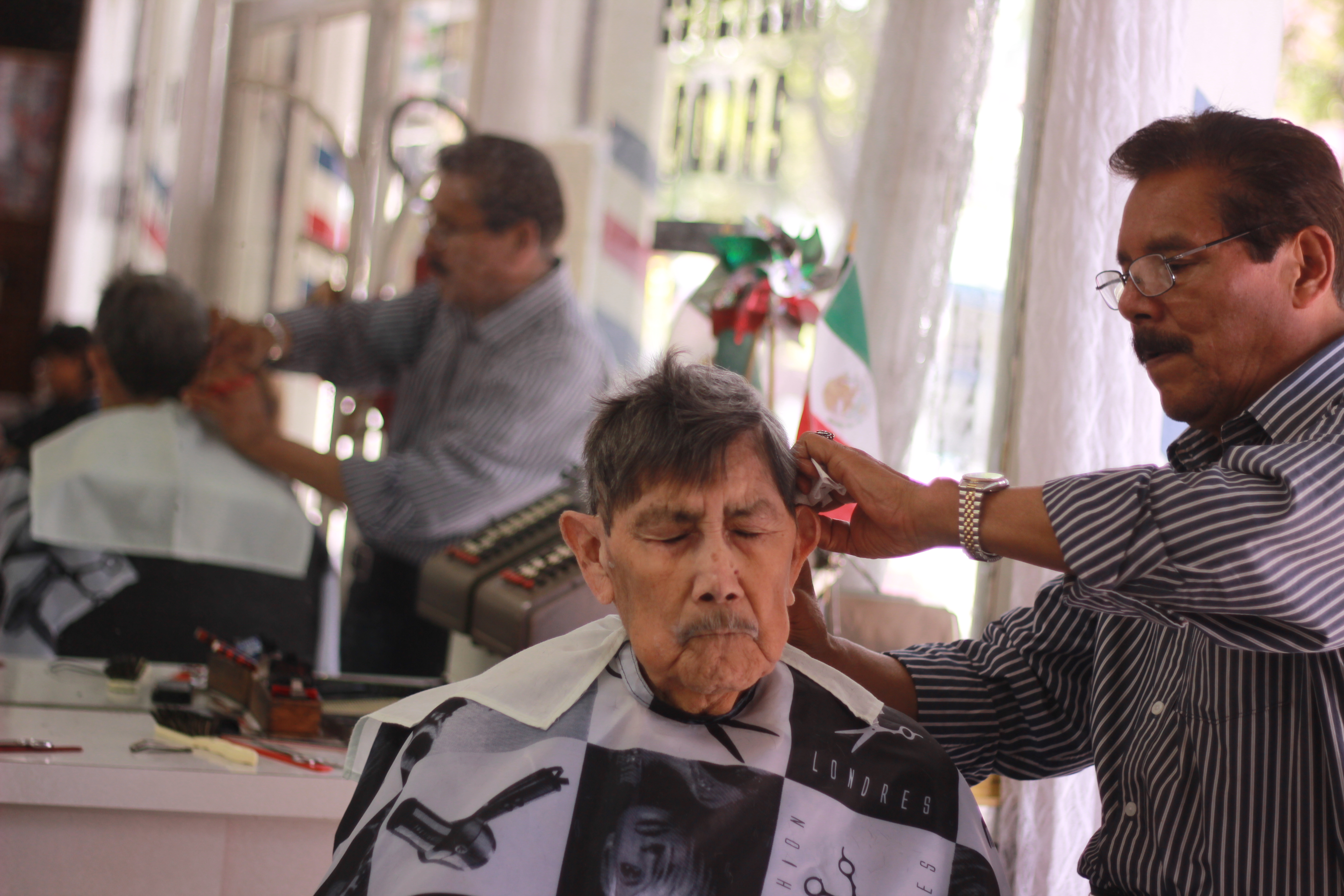
A barber working in Mexico City. The barber is an example of a profession spawned by the social division of labor.

Social division of labor, one of the two aspects of the division of labor, is the social structural foundation of the specialized commodity production divided between industries, firms, and occupations of workers (otherwise known as the technical division of tasks).

Before the emergence of centralized manufacturing, individuals specialized in the development of one product and traded it for finished products made by other individuals. While this relationship can describe specialized trades within a community, such as master sewers, blacksmiths, and farmers, it can also refer to the specializations of several networked communities. For example, one community might make clothes for the purpose of exchange, while another makes tools and a third produces food for the same purpose. Social division of labor greatly increases productivity, because individuals can work on whichever product provides them a comparative advantage, and then trade it to the individuals who cannot efficiently produce it. The social division of labor also creates trade markets and prices, which operate in part by comparing the cost and time required to make each product.

This type of relationship can be socially and economically advantageous; however, too much specialization can also lead to major disadvantages. First, if a community specializes too heavily on a product, they can become dependent on the success of that product and will experience an economic disaster if the product is replaced (or becomes extinct). For example, if bananas go extinct or grow under bad seasonal conditions in Ecuador, the economy will suffer along with the whole community. A second disadvantage develops if all communities come to rely on a product developed by a single community, because that community would then have a monopoly on that product and would be able to withhold production for their own benefit. The third disadvantage is that individual workers, now specialized for particular occupational skillsets, may be vulnerable to economic reorganizations. These can be triggered by volatile 'product cycles' and the development of new industries, where representation in union constituencies is different from that of older, outsourced, or automated ones (for example, financial services vs. weaving).

Marxists argue that capitalism, and modes of production in general, change through revolutions in the means of production, which result in populations of unemployed workers who are over-specialized in niche occupations and, as a result, are unable to reenter the labor force amid spiraling unemployment.
