= Global Society (journal) =

Global Society: Journal of Interdisciplinary International Relations
- Discipline: International relations, global governance, globalization
- Language: English
- Edited by: Rubrick Biegon, Ingvild Bode, Juanita Elias, Tom Casier and Alexandre Christoyannopoulos

Publication details
- Former name: Paradigms
- History: 1987–present
- Publisher: Taylor & Francis on behalf of the University of Kent (United Kingdom)
- Frequency: Quarterly

Standard abbreviations
- ISO 4: Glob. Soc.

Indexing
- ISSN: 1360-0826 (print); 1469-798X (web)
- OCLC no.: 45010076

Links
- Journal homepage; Online access; Online archive

Global Society is a quarterly peer-reviewed academic journal covering international relations and globalization. It was established in 1987 as Paradigms and obtained its current name in 1996. The editor-in-chief is Rubrick Biegon (University of Kent). The journal is published by Taylor & Francis on behalf of the University of Kent.

== Abstracting and indexing ==
Global Society is abstracted and indexed in Scopus, EBSCOhost, International Political Science Abstracts Database, Political Science Complete, CSA Worldwide Political Science Abstracts, and PAIS International and Sociological Abstracts.

== See also ==
- List of globalization-related journals
