= New international division of labour =

Concept in economics

In economics, the new international division of labour (NIDL) is a spatial division of labor that occurs when the process of production is no longer confined to national economies. It is an outcome of globalization: under the "old" international division of labor, until around 1970, underdeveloped areas were incorporated into the world economy principally as suppliers of minerals and agricultural commodities; but as developing economies are merged into the world economy, more production takes place in these economies. The term was coined by theorists seeking to explain the spatial shift of manufacturing industries from advanced capitalist countries to developing countries — an ongoing geographic reorganisation of production, which finds its origins in ideas about a global division of labor.

This has led to a trend of transference, or what is also known as the "global industrial shift", in which production processes are relocated from developed countries (such as the US, European countries, and Japan) to developing countries in Asia (such as China, Vietnam, and India), Mexico and Central America. This is because companies search for the cheapest locations to manufacture and assemble components, so low-cost labor-intensive parts of the manufacturing process are shifted to the developing world where costs are substantially lower. Companies do so by taking advantage of transportation and communications technology, as well as fragmentation and locational flexibility of production. From 1953 to the late 1990s, the industrialised economies' share of world manufacturing output declined from 95% to 77%, and the developing economies' share more than quadrupled from 5% to 23%.

World map showing countries above, and below the median 2010 GDP (PPP) per capita, US$10,700. Source: IMF (International Monetary Fund). Blue above world GDP (PPP) per capita Orange below world GDP (PPP) per capita

The resultant division of labor across continents closely follows the North–South socio-economic and political divide, where in the North—with one quarter of the world population—controls four fifths of the world income, while the South—with three quarters of the world population—has access to one fifth of the world income.

== See also ==
- Disposable household and per capita income
- Global labor arbitrage
- Global workforce
- International relations
- New International Economic Order
- South–South cooperation
