= Transnational cinema =

Transnational cinema is a developing concept within film studies that encompasses a range of theories relating to the effects of globalization upon the cultural and economic aspects of film. It incorporates the debates and influences of postnationalism, postcolonialism, consumerism and Third cinema, amongst many other topics.

As the flow of transnational cinematic collaboration and stylistic influence across national borders complicates the idea of a purely national understanding of cinema, some scholars such as Andrew Higson argue that a nation-based framework of cinema analysis would "obscure the degree of cultural diversity, exchange, and interpenetration that marks so much cinematic activity," necessitating a framework that accounts for transnational hybridity.

== Criteria ==
Transnational cinema debates consider the development and subsequent effect of films, cinemas and directors which span national boundaries.

The concept of transnational flows and connection in cinema is not a new term – judging by film history and the increasing number of book titles that now bear its name – but the recent theoretical and paradigmatic shift raises new attention and questions.

Transnational cinema urges a certain shift away from films with a national focus. Ezra and Rowden argue that Transnational cinema “comprises both globalization […] and the counter hegemonic responses of filmmakers from former colonial and third world countries”, and further that the transnational can link people or institutions across the nations.

The transnational works like a partnership which is joined together through several mediums, such as cinema. In connection to this, Sheldon Lu has identified what she calls ‘an era of transnational postmodern cultural production’ in which borders between nations have been blurred by new telecommunications technologies as a means of explaining the shift from national to transnational cinema.

As to this, the telecommunications technologies threatens the concept of a national cinema, as especially the connection powers of the internet links people and institutions and thereby converts national cinema to a transnational cinema. Ezra and Rowden states: "the vast increase in the circulation of films enabled by technologies such as video, DVD and new digital media heightens the accessibility of such technology for both film-makers and spectators".

Transnational cinema’ appears to be used and applied with increasing frequency and as Higbee and Song Hwee argues, as a shorthand for an international mode of film production whose impact and reach lies beyond the bounds of the national. The term is occasionally used in a simplified way to indicate international coproduction or partnership between e.g. the cast, crew and location without any real consideration of what the aesthetic, political or economic implications of such transnational collaboration might mean.

Based on this proliferation of the term, Higbee and Song Hwee mention that it has led some scholars to questions whether the term is profitable to use or not. In fact, a panel on transnational cinema took place at the 2009 Screen Studies Conference in Glasgow where members questioned the term ‘transnational’ and its critical purpose in film theory.

== Key debates ==
A key argument of transnational cinema is the necessity for a redefinition, or even refutation, of the concept of a national cinema. National identity has been posited as an 'imaginary community' that in reality is formed of many separate and fragmented communities defined more by social class, economic class, sexuality, gender, generation, religion, ethnicity, political belief and fashion, than nationality.

The increasingly transnational practices in film funding, production, and distribution combined with the 'imagined community' thus provide the basis for an argued shift towards a greater use of transnational, rather than national, perspectives within film studies. Global communication through the internet has also resulted in changes within culture and has further resulted in film transcending perceived national boundaries.

== Ongoing definition ==
The broad scope of topics relating to Transnational cinema has raised some criticisms over its exact definition, as Mette Hjort notes:

(...) to date the discourse of cinematic transnationalism has been characterized less by competing theories and approaches than by a tendency to use the term ‘transnational’ as a largely self-evident qualifier requiring only minimal conceptual clarification.

Subsequently, Hjort, John Hess, and Patricia R. Zimmermann, amongst others, have attempted to clearly define the utilization and implementation of Transnational cinema theories.

The concept of ‘transnational cinema’ has been highly debated for decades and scholars have yet to agree on a single definition. In fact, in many cases, the various definitions of ‘transnational cinema’ presented by different scholars have been very much in contradiction to one another. Scholars have taken to breaking down the term into distinct categories, in an attempt to allow a generally broad idea to become more clearly defined.

For example, Deborah Shaw of the University of Portsmouth alongside Armida De La Garza of University College Cork, created a carefully crafted list of fifteen types of reading film through a transnational lens. The categories included: modes of narration; national films; transregional/transcommunity films; transnational critical approaches; cinema of globalization; films with multiple locations; modes of production, distribution, and exhibition; transnational collaborative networks; transnational viewing practices; transregional/transcommunity films; cultural exchange; transnational influences; transnational stars; transnational directors; the ethics of transnationalism; exilic and diasporic filmmaking; and transnational collaborative networks.

In addition, Mette Hijort of Lingnan University in Hong Kong, coined seven modes of transnational cinematic production: cosmopolitan; affinitive; epiphanic; globalizing; milieu-building; opportunistic; and experimental. More broadly, Steven Vertovec of the Institute for the Study of Religious and Ethnic Diversity, presented six facets of transnationalism in general which he believed to be worthy of further research. Specifically, transnationalism as: a type of consciousness; a site of political engagement; an avenue of capital; a (re)construction of ‘place’ or locality; social morphology; and a mode of cultural reproduction.

Despite these attempts to repeatedly divide transnational cinema into more digestible and comprehensible pieces, the concept still remains largely ambiguous. The term is often used when referring to foreign films consumed by those of different nationalities with the help of subtitles, as well as in reference to films that “challenge national identity."

To certain scholars it marks the moment in time when globalization began to impact the art of cinema, while to others it stretches back to the earliest days of filmmaking. Some consider it to be “big-budget blockbuster cinema associated with the operations of global corporate capital, [and still others define it as] small-budget diasporic and exilic cinema.”

Dr. Zhang Yingjin, a professor of Chinese Studies and Comparative Literature at the University of California, San Diego, goes as far as to argue that the term is obsolete due to the volume and inconsistency of its uses and definitions. He explains that if the concept merely points to film as a medium that has the ability to transcend languages, cultures, and nations, then it has been “already subsumed by comparative film studies” and therefore lacks any value within academia.

== Problems within Transnational Cinema ==
While the dynamic and often contradictory term itself sparks confusion, there remain many films that effectively represent the nature of transnational cinema in a multitude of ways, working to unthink Eurocentric film norms. While traditional cinema has the tendency to perpetuate binary division, World Cinema makes efforts to overcome those binaries to be all-encompassing and inclusive. Despite these efforts, however, the “films most likely to circulate transnationally are those that are more ‘Western-friendly’” and have adopted “familiar genres, narratives, or themes.” This is often done to fulfill the “desire for tasty, easily swallowed, apolitical global-cultural morsels,” craved by audiences accustomed to American Orientalism.

The 2012 Oscar-nominated documentary film The Act of Killing, directed by Joshua Oppenheimer uses reenactment as a process of memory and critical thinking in the re-telling of the Indonesian genocide of 1965. It focuses on one perpetrator, in particular, revisiting and re-enacting his experiences as an executioner, forcing himself and audiences to physically and psychologically re-live the historical event. The re-enactment provides a physical discourse that allows audiences and actors alike to re-live the events that took place, recreating memories on screen.

While the film takes place from the perspective of the perpetrator, focusing on the experiences of those murdered, it was not directed by anyone involved or affected, but rather by a white, Western filmmaker. With his whiteness and Western perspective comes a sense of trust and authority felt by Indonesian elites as well as world-wide audiences of which Oppenheimer was aware, using it to his advantage as a storyteller.

This problematic Westernized view often shines through in Oppenheimer’s questions and commentary throughout what he calls a "documentary of the imagination". Though well-intentioned, his “love letter” of a film becomes a “shock therapy session prescribed and carried out by a concerned Westerner” rather than an authentic retelling from the Indonesian perspective.

This film is a prime example of the problems that arise within the world of Transnational cinema; Films are often tailored to the Western audience or at the very least, told by a member of the Western world. Since most authentic transnational films void of Eurocentric influence are distributed via film festivals rather than blockbuster screenings, they often do not easily reach Western audiences. Should films such as The Act of Killing cross borders and nations, they require funding that only Western-based films are provided- many of which end up speaking for minority groups from a majority perspective.

As Linda Alcoff frames it, certain anthropological conversations become "conversations of 'us' with 'us' about 'them' of the white man with the white man about the primitive-nature man," constantly othering those who are oppressed or do not fall within Eurocentric standards. She believes it to be necessary that the "study of and advocacy for the oppressed" must be conducted by the oppressed themselves, rather than those more privileged.

In fact, the act of speaking from a place of privilege on the behalf of those less privileged often results in reinforced oppression of those minority groups. Transnational films must strive to follow these same guidelines, allowing for stories to be told by those who have lived them or by those still affected by the events of those stories. Creating a global community through transnational cinema can be possible, but only when the tools and perspectives involved branch beyond the binary of Western versus "other."

== List of transnationalist films ==
- Rashomon (1950)
- Yojimbo (1961)
- Ju Dou (1990)
- Closer to Home (film) (1995)
- Ring (1998)
- Crouching Tiger, Hidden Dragon (2000)
- Ararat (2002)
- The Ring (2002)
- Batman Begins (2005)
- Caché (2005)
- Unveiled (2005)
- Babel (2006)
- The Dark Knight (2008)
- Slumdog Millionaire (2008)
- The Act of Killing (2012)
- Parasite (2019)

== List of filmmakers associated with transnational cinema ==
- Akira Kurosawa
- Christopher Nolan
- Joshua Oppenheimer
- Ang Lee

== See also ==
- Film theory
- Diaspora studies
- World cinema
- Transnationalism
- Orientalism
- Postmodernist film
- Xenophobia
