= Triadization =

Macroeconomic philosophy

Triadization (or triadisation) is a proposed alternative to the theory of globalization. It states that political, economic and socio-cultural integration have been limited to three regions of the world: Japan and the newly industrialized countries of Southeast Asia, Western Europe and North America.

Outside of these regions, according to the theory, the effects of so-called "globalization" have not been felt, and hence it cannot be truly called "global". Instead, the economic interdependence between the countries of the "triad" supposedly leads to the alienation of the developing world. This alienation is described by the theory as the result of the fact that "fragmentation of the world into regional blocks is taking place, featured in the tendency to strengthen economic interdependence and transactions within them but not among them". This further entrenches the position of the triad, and prevents the growth of the rest of the world.

== See also ==
- Economic integration
- Four Asian Tigers
