= List of globalization-related journals =

Peer-reviewed, scientific journals related to the study of globalization include the following:

- Antipode
- Development and Change
- Economic Geography
- Global Affairs
- Global Education Magazine
- Global Environmental Politics
- Global Governance: A Review of Multilateralism and International Organizations
- Global Health Action
- Global Policy
- Global Society
- Globalization and Health
- Glocalism: Journal of Culture, Politics and Innovation
- The Journal of Environment & Development
- Journal of Global History
- Journal of World History
- Journal of World-Systems Research
- Natural Resources Forum
- Public Culture
- World Development
