= Displaced person (disambiguation) =

A displaced person is a person subject to forced displacement.

Displaced person or displaced persons may also refer to:

- Refugee
- Internally displaced person
- Displaced Person (American Playhouse), a 1985 episode of American anthology television series American Playhouse based on the short story "D.P." by Kurt Vonnegut
- "The Displaced Person", a novella by Flannery O'Connor
- Displaced Persons (film), a 1985 Australian TV movie about refugees arriving in Australia in 1945
- Displaced Person (novel), a 1979 novel by Lee Harding
