= Global civics =

Global approach to civics

Global civics proposes to understand civics in a global sense as a social contract among all world citizens in an age of interdependence and interaction. The disseminators of the concept define it as the notion that we have certain rights and responsibilities towards each other by the mere fact of being human on Earth.

The advocates of the notion attempt to demonstrate that it is possible to imagine global civics. According to this notion, in an increasingly interdependent world, world citizens need a compass that would frame mindsets on a global scale, and create a shared consciousness and sense of global responsibility related to specific world issues such as environmental problems and nuclear proliferation.

== History of the concept ==
The term global civics was first coined by Hakan Altinay, a nonresident senior fellow with the Global Economy and Development program at the Brookings Institution, in a working paper published in March 2010. The concept builds upon the basic tenets behind global ethics, global justice and world citizenship, inviting everyone to question their increasingly important role in a highly interdependent world. In early 2011, Altinay published Global Civics: Responsibilities and Rights in an Interdependent World, a book of articles on global civics put forth by academics and intellectuals all around the world.

== Criticism ==
Opponents of the global civics concept argue that even a modest level of exercising responsibility towards all the people living in the world is so overwhelming and nearly impossible to achieve. These arguments also posit that civics assumes an effective state and enforcement. The claim goes that since there is no such thing as a world government, global civics implementation is not feasible. Also, it has been suggested that superpowers of the world are selfish and dangerous nations, and that they do not feel constrained by international legitimacy and laws. Finally, the critics claim that any experience of pan-global solidarity among human beings cannot form the basis of constellation of rights and responsibilities as it is nascent at best and the experience of being a global citizen is a privilege restricted to international elites and a few activists.

== The role of universities ==
The proponents of global civics also suggest that university campuses play a vital role in spreading a thorough understanding of how today's global world functions and contributes toward preparation of future generations for life in an interdependent world. This view calls for visionary universities that could successfully "provide their students with the forums and the tools to discuss and figure out what their responsibilities are to their fellow human beings."

Since 2014, the concept of a global-civic university has been developed by Te Herenga Waka - Victoria University of Wellington. The University views civic engagement in a contemporary, global context noting that as well as engaging with the Wellington region the University contributes to New Zealand, to the Asia–Pacific region and to the world. The University's Vice-Chancellor, Professor Grant Guilford, has defined global-civic universities as those in which:

- the virtuous cycle connecting great universities with healthy communities is actively fostered in a sustainable and intergenerational manner
- community engagement is a core function alongside teaching and research and is seen in both a local and global context
- the university’s international agenda is one of partnership—linking the local to the global and the global to the local—and the provision of knowledge to enhance global governance and the global commons
- public good values dominate over market values
- securing the intellectual potential put at risk through experience of disadvantage is a collective priority
- research quality and research impact are co-priorities
- ranking with the world’s best universities is the shared expectation.

== See also ==
- Cosmopolitanism
- Global citizenship
- Global citizenship education
- Oneness of humanity (Baháʼí)
- Universal value
