= Family economy =

Economics concept

The family economy is a term used to describe the family as an economic unit. The early stages of development in many economies are characterized by family based production.

According to Ross and Sawhill, most economic activity in pre-industrial times occurred within the household, with economic activities like production and distribution being arranged through culture and tradition. The family was also important because birth, family ties, and local custom determined economic status in communities. They describe the family as a "productive unit" and state that physical strength was an essential element in survival.

The family economic unit has always been dependent on specialized labor done by family members. The family was a multi-generational producer with capital and land provided by older generations and labor provided by younger generations. Goods were produced not only for home consumption but to sell and trade in the market as well. Family production was not only limited to agricultural products but they also produced manufacturing goods and provided services.

In order to sustain a viable family economy during the pre-industrial era, labor was needed. The labor needed to operate the farm and provide old-age support came from family members, fertility was high. High fertility and guaranteed employment on the family farm made education, beyond the basic literacy needed to read the Bible, expensive and unnecessary.

== Industrial revolution in Europe ==
Around the time of the post industrial stage, the European family changed from a unit of production to a unit of consumption. The new era of industrialization that Europe now found itself in brought numerous change to Europe. Now farming could be done with less individuals, removing the need for children as economic assets and instead created a view in which they were seen as liabilities. In addition to this, new ideas and inventions that allowed for the industrialization to take place further contributed to the demise of the family economy. The new social norms saw a capitalist market that encouraged production in large scale factories, farms and mines. Wage labor would become a staple of European society and saw family members no longer working together but instead using their wages they had earned to buy goods which they consumed as a family unit. The industrial revolution, starting in the nineteenth and going into the twentieth century, is seen as the force that changed the economic family and is essentially responsible for the "modern family."
