= Global workforce =

International labor pool of workers

Global workforce refers to the international labor pool of workers, including those employed by multinational companies and connected through a global system of networking and production, foreign workers, transient migrant workers, remote workers, those in export-oriented employment, contingent workforce or other precarious work. As of 2012, the global labor pool consisted of approximately 3 billion workers, around 200 million unemployed.

== Structure of global labour ==
=== New international division of labor ===
The global workforce, or international labor pool, reflects a new international division of labor that has been emerging since the late 1970s in the wake of other forces of globalization. The global economic factors driving the rise of multinational corporations—namely, cross-border movement of goods, services, technology and capital—are changing ways of thinking about labor and the structure of today's workforce. With roots in the social processes surrounding the shift to standardization and industrialization, post-industrial society in the Western world has been accompanied by industrialization in other parts of the world, particularly in Asia. As industrialization takes hold worldwide and more cultures move away from traditional practices in respect to work and labor, the ways in which employers think about and utilize labor are changing. Usually, barriers come into play such as different laws.

=== Labor supply ===
The global supply of labor almost doubled in absolute numbers between the 1980s and early 2000s, with half of that growth coming from Asia. At the same time, the rate at which new workers entered the workforce in the Western world began to decline. The growing pool of global labor is accessed by employers in more advanced economies through various methods, including imports of goods, offshoring of production, and immigration. Global labor arbitrage, the practice of accessing the lowest-cost workers from all parts of the world, is partly a result of this enormous growth in the workforce. While most of the absolute increase in this global labor supply consisted of less-educated workers (those without higher education), the relative supply of workers with higher education increased by about 50 percent during the same period. From 1980 to 2010, the global workforce grew from 1.2 to 2.9 billion people. According to a 2012 report by the McKinsey Global Institute, this was caused mostly by developing nations, where there was a "farm to factory" transition. Non-farming jobs grew from 54 percent in 1980 to almost 73 percent in 2010. This industrialization took an estimated 620 million people out of poverty and contributed to the economic development of China, India and others. The Institute estimates that increased exports in developing countries contribute to one-fifth of non-farm jobs in those nations and that immigrants from developing countries contributed to 40 percent of the workforce in advanced ones. By 2008 foreign-born workers accounted for 17 percent of all STEM (science, technology, engineering and math) positions in the United States.

=== Employment and unemployment ===
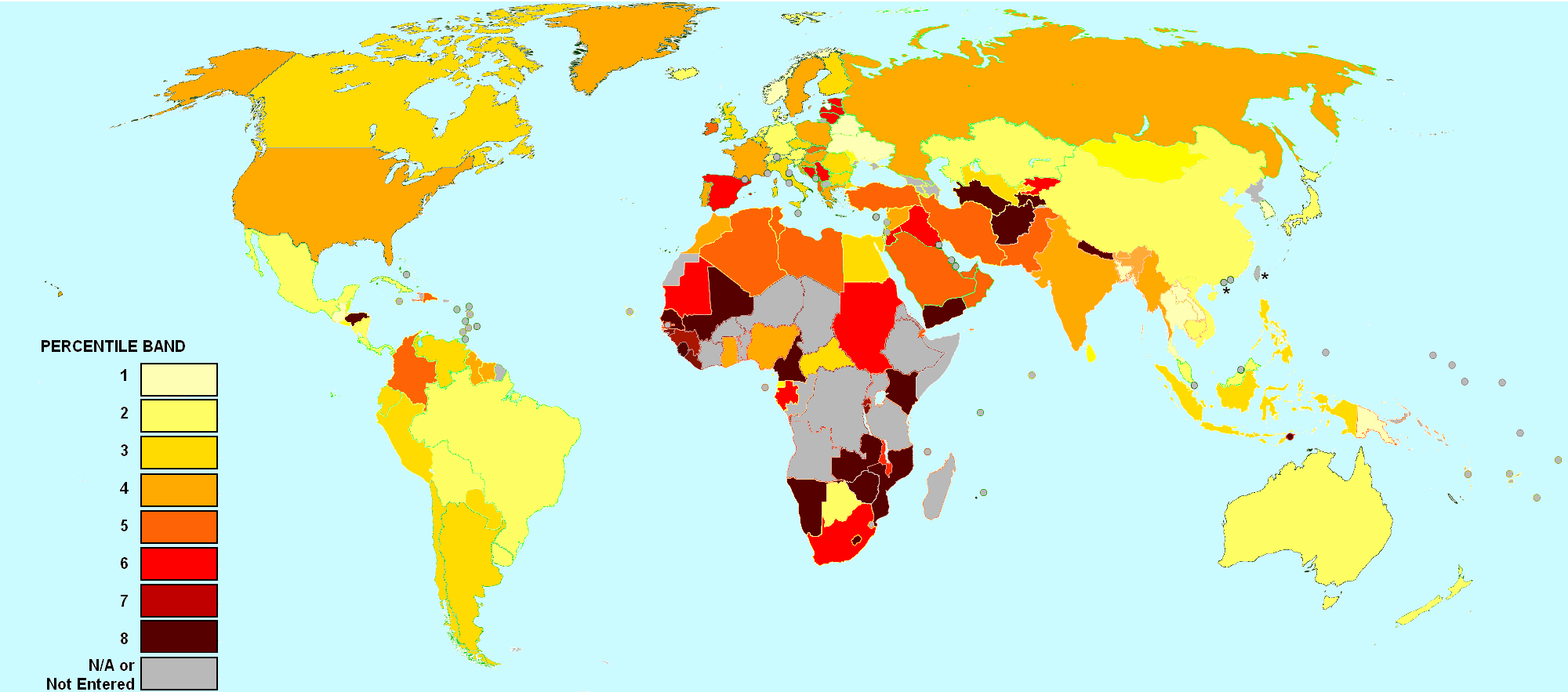
Unemployment by country, 2010

Employment is growing fastest in emerging and developing economies. Over the past 5 years, the incidence of long-term unemployment (the share of unemployed persons out of work for 12 months or more) has increased 60% in the advanced and developing economies for which data exist. Global unemployment is expected to approach 208 million in 2015, compared with slightly over 200 million in 2012.

From January 2012 to January 2013, Italy experienced the largest increase in its unemployment rate (+2.1 percentage points), followed by the Netherlands (+1.0 percentage point), and France (+0.6 percentage point). Over that same period, Canada experienced the largest decrease in its unemployment rate (−0.5 percentage points), followed by the United States (−0.4 percentage point).

The number of people employed in precarious work (also called "vulnerable employment")— employment that is poorly paid, insecure, unprotected, and cannot support a household—has increased dramatically in recent decades. This includes Part-time jobs, self-employment or freelancers, homeworkers, fixed-term or temporary work, on-call work, and other contingent workforce jobs.

=== Demographic trends ===
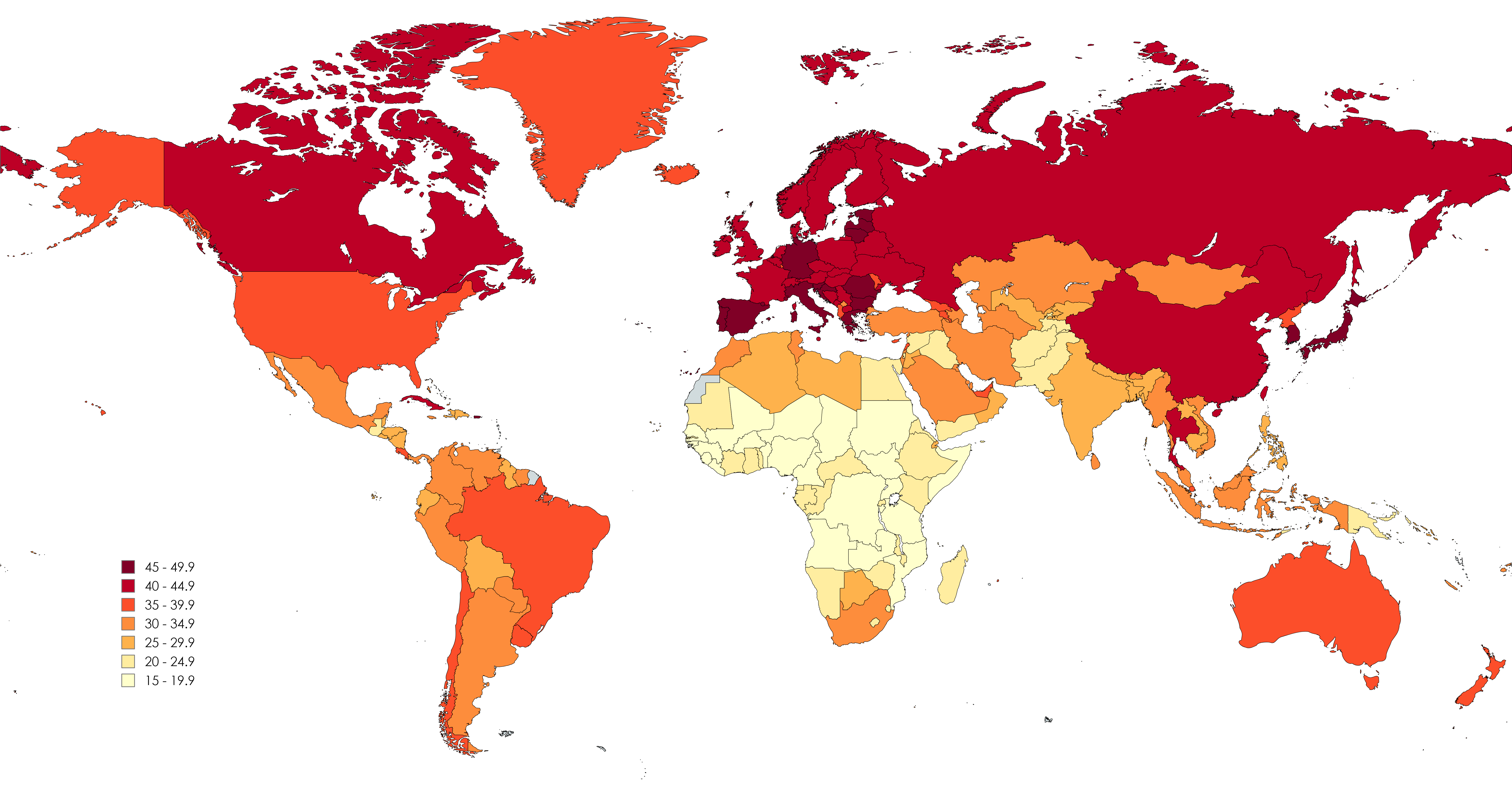
Median age by country, 2024

These numbers show that, globally, the structure of the workforce has been changing. In addition to the economic and social factors described above, a large part of this restructuring is also due to demographic factors, changes in the structure of the world's population. In wealthier countries with more advanced economies, fewer people die from communicable diseases and, overall, life expectancies are much longer while birth rates are lower. In these areas, the overall median age is rising (see List of countries by median age). The youngest populations, primarily those in Southeast Asia and Africa, are those in which overall life expectancies are lower—many children and some adults still die from communicable diseases—but the birth rate is also high.

=== Global worker mobility ===
The movement of individuals across national, regional, cultural, or linguistic boundaries has been referred to as "global mobility." This global workforce mobility impacts an employer's ability to provide goods or services to users and consumers. Management theory attempts to address these movements of globally mobile individuals ranging from business expatriates to more recently identified groups such as self-initiated expatriates, international business travelers, international commuters, and "flexpatriates" (short-term assignees and international commuters).

Movement of people across national borders is becoming increasingly common. Traditionally, this has been described in terms of push and pull forces that drive migrant workers and immigrant laborers toward more developed countries. However, not all labor mobility is outward movement toward more advanced economies. An increasing number of individuals move to less developed countries to provide new expertise or return their expertise to their country of origin. This includes a return movement or repatriation of internationally relocated individuals such as immigrants, refugees, sojourners, retirees, military personnel, international students, or other expatriates. Such movements of people may influence interstate relationships concerning politics, economics and culture. Thus, global workforce mobility research is relevant to both host and home country policies. From a focus on longer-term and assigned expatriation, current research is focusing on the drivers and dynamics of a range of new alternative forms of global mobility in the workforce. Reviews on global workforce mobility have been recently published by Caligiuri and Bonache, and Collings and Sheeran.

With the rise in remote work and virtual teams during and after the COVID-19 pandemic, academics described a shift toward "the replacement of personal physical international interactions for work purposes with electronic personal online international interactions", summarized as "virtual global mobility".

== Implications ==
=== Social vulnerability ===
One issue related to the shift of employment to countries with an overall younger population has to do with the dependency ratio in differing countries. The dependency ratio is an age-population ratio of those typically not in the labor force (the dependent part) and those typically in the labor force (the productive part). A high dependency ratio can cause serious problems for a country if a large proportion of a government's expenditure is on health, social security & education, which are most used by the youngest and the oldest in a population. The fewer people of working age, the fewer the people who can support schools, retirement pensions, disability pensions and other assistances to the youngest and oldest members of a population, often considered the most vulnerable members of society.

=== Downward pressure on wages ===
Another issue can arise in regard to the capital-labor ratio in the global population. Freeman (2010) holds that the new entrants to the global workforce since the 1980s brought little capital with them, either because they were poor or because the capital they had was of little economic value. He estimates that the entry of China, India and the Eastern Bloc into the global economy cut the global capital-labor ratio to around 55–60% of what it otherwise would have been. The capital-labor ratio, according to Freeman, is a critical determinant of the wages paid to workers and of the returns to capital. The more capital each worker has, the higher will be their productivity and pay. Even considering the high savings rate of new entrants—he cites World Bank estimates that China has a savings rate of 40% of GDP—he estimates it would take 30 or so years for the world to re-attain the capital-labor ratio among the countries that had previously made up the global economy. This, along with the effects of the Great Recession, could mean that downward pressure on wages and compensation, particularly in more advanced economies, will continue for the foreseeable future.

=== Race to the bottom ===
"Race to the bottom" is a phrase coined to describe the potential outcome of companies searching for the lowest-cost in all their business needs. For example, lowest taxes and tariffs, land, materials, labor, etc. In terms of global labor arbitrage, the lowest-cost labor is often found in countries that have the fewest protections for workers. Such protections, collectively known as labor rights, include regulation of child labor, workplace safety, work hours, minimum wages, and the availability of collective bargaining. One potential outcome of widespread global labor arbitrage, then, is exploitation and even death of workers in countries that have the fewest protections. Another potential outcome is an undermining of the protections that are already in place in some countries; that is, a pressure to lower domestic and, ultimately, international labor standards. One example of this is employer abuse of guest worker programs wherein employers act to sponsor guest workers at lower wages in order to decrease the overall domestic standard wage for workers in a given occupation, such as with Information technology workers in the United States.

=== Mitigating factors ===
However, other forces may mitigate these processes. Some observe that a growing number of multinationals, especially from wealthier areas, are starting to see the benefits of keeping more of their operations close to home. For many products, labor is a small and diminishing fraction of total costs. Long, complex supply chains, it turns out, are likely riskier than many firms may have realized. For example, when an epidemic such as SARS hits Asia or when an earthquake hits Japan, supply chains are disrupted. Also, as emerging economies boom, wages there are rising. The benefits of global labor arbitrage may disappear, particularly in basic manufacturing and especially in China, where wages have been rising the fastest.

== Registered Employer (EOR) ==
This is a third-party organization that officially acts as the employer for employees on behalf of another company. The EOR takes on responsibility for legal and administrative employment matters such as payroll processing, tax payments, benefits administration, and compliance with local labor laws. While the EOR handles these formalities, the client company controls the daily activities and work of the employees. This mechanism is often used by companies wishing to hire employees in regions where they do not have a registered legal entity.

EOR services are frequently utilized by companies seeking to hire employees in countries where they lack local subsidiaries. The EOR allows companies to operate in foreign markets while ensuring that all employment practices comply with local legislation. This arrangement also enables companies to avoid the complexities associated with establishing and maintaining a legal entity in each jurisdiction where they want to hire employees.

For many companies, establishing a legal entity in each new country is expensive, time-consuming, and often impractical. This is where the EOR becomes a strategic partner. Instead of building your own infrastructure, you can rely on a registered employer who acts as the official employer on paper. The EOR assumes legal and administrative responsibilities, while you manage the day-to-day work and objectives of the team.

The EOR takes on responsibility for compliance with local labor laws, which vary from country to country and can be quite complex regulatory-wise. By managing these legal obligations, the EOR reduces the risks faced by companies when hiring employees abroad.

== See also ==
- Contingent workforce
- Globalization
- Labor mobility
- Labor rights
- List of countries by labor force
- Multinational corporation
- Workforce
- World economy
