= Plant Resources of Tropical Africa =

International programme improving access to information about useful plants in Africa

Plant Resources of Tropical Africa Foundation (PROTA)
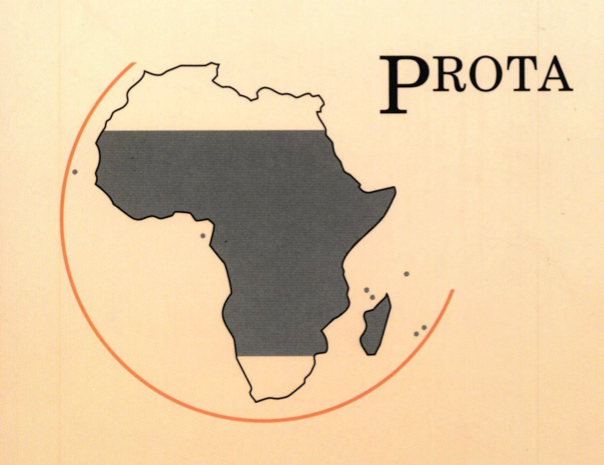
- Formation: 2000
- Founded at: Wageningen University
- Dissolved: 2013
- Type: Documentation program; NGO
- Legal status: Foundation
- Purpose: To improve access to information about useful plants in Africa
- Headquarters: Wageningen, Netherlands; Nairobi, Kenya (formerly)
- Region served: Tropical Africa
- Products: PROTA Encyclopedia Series; PROTA Recommends Book Series; PROTA4U Database
- Fields: Ethnobotany, Botany, Anthropology, African Studies, Horticulture, Forestry, International Development
- Official language: English, French
- Key people: J.S. Siemonsma (Program Director); R.H. Lemmens (General Editor); L.P. Oyen (General Editor); G.H. Schmelzer (Editor); C.H. Bosch (Editor); M. Brink (Editor); A. de Ruijter (Editor); P.C. Jansen (Editor); E.A. Boer (Photo Editor); T.H. Tan (Databank Manager); P.M. Parker (Database Creator); E.A. Omino (Africa/Kenya); S. Mbadinga (Gabon); J.S. Kaboggoza (Uganda); S. Rapanarivo (Madagascar); Z.L. Magombo (Malawi); J.R. Cobbinah (Ghana); M. Ouédraogo (Burkina Faso); M. Honadia (Burkina Faso); M. Chauvet (France); S.D. Davis (UK)
- Affiliations: University of Wageningen
- Website: https://www.prota4u.org/database/

Plant Resources of Tropical Africa, known by its acronym PROTA, is a retired NGO and interdisciplinary documentation programme active between 2000 and 2013. PROTA produced a large database and various publications about Africa's useful plants.

== Purpose ==
PROTA was concerned with increasing accessibility to traditional knowledge and scientific information about many types of African plants including: dyes & tannins, fibers, medicinal plants, stimulants, tropical timbers, vegetables, tubers (carbohydrates), oil seeds, ornamental plants, forage plants, and cereals. PROTA supported the sustainable use of these useful plants to preserve culture, reduce poverty and hunger, and respond to climate change. To this end, PROTA's overall goal was synthesize diverse, published information for approximately 8,000 plants used in tropical Africa, then make it widely accessible through an online database and various book publications. In other words, PROTA was dedicated to making the useful plant biodiversity of tropical Africa better-known and respected.

PROTA's database and various publications are considered unique in their epistemological approach because they were compiled as much from obscure publications as from peer-reviewed and popular literature, gathered throughout Africa and Europe. In this way PROTA publications include Africa-centered references and perspectives, which is a major focus of the broader discipline of African studies. PROTA also was an international NGO registered in Nairobi, Kenya that used information from its publications to structure a number of community projects involving over 800 farmers in Benin, Botswana, Burkina Faso, Kenya, and Madagascar.

Some of PROTA's other goals included:

- to promote the sustainable use of plants to the public and private sectors
- to facilitate socially inclusive, collaborative research about African plants from experts in Africa and elsewhere
- to make research about African plants more accessible
- to support intellectual property rights related to the commercial use of African plants
- to help graduate students and researchers identify research gaps
- to provide research-driven educational materials to vocational and farmer education programs in Africa

== Current status ==
=== Funding ===
PROTA retired in 2013 while facing large operational costs after its funding expired. At the point of its retirement, about 50% of PROTA's encyclopedia series was complete. During its operation, PROTA received funds from the European Union's Directorate-General for International Partnerships, Netherlands Ministry of Foreign Affairs, Netherlands Ministry of Agriculture, Netherlands Organization for Scientific Research, Wageningen University, COFRA Foundation, International Tropical Timber Organization, and the Bill & Melinda Gates Foundation. Since the program's retirement there have been ongoing efforts to fundraise and preserve PROTA's various publications and online database.

=== Preservation ===
As of 2022, the PROTA database Prota4U is still online in an archive-like capacity at Wageningen University with articles written in English and French. Information in the PROTA database can also be accessed at the website Pl@ntUse–though in a different format. As of 2019, Prota4U had about 1,500 daily visitors and 500,000 unique visitors each year. All of the PROTA's encyclopedia volumes have been digitized and are available for free as Open access publications from the Wageningen University library. It is uncertain how much of the PROTA Recommends Series has been digitized.

In 2023, PROTA began working with graduate students and faculty affiliated with Indiana University's African Studies Program in Bloomington, Indiana, USA to preserve the PROTA4U online database and digitise remaining publications.

== Partners ==
The programme operated through an international network of institutional partners and collaborators of the PROTA Foundation. PROTA had representatives in 20 African countries and dual headquarters in Wageningen, Netherlands and Nairobi, Kenya. PROTA also had regional offices with institutional partners in Burkina Faso, France, Gabon, Ghana, Madagascar, Malawi, Uganda, and the United Kingdom. In Wageningen, PROTA also partnered with the EU funded, Technical Centre for Agricultural and Rural Cooperation (CTA) and the now-retired Agromisa Foundation to help distribute its various publications. Agromisa and PROTA were considered suitable partners because they were both committed to bridging the gap between scientific knowledge and traditional knowledge and were open access publishers of books with practical information about sustainable agriculture for small-farmers in Africa.

PROTA Institutional Partners
Affiliation	Institution	Country
Francophone Regional Office	Centre National de Semences Forestieres	Burkina Faso
France Country Office	Acropolis International	France
Central Africa Regional Office	Centre National de la Recherche Scientifique et Technologique	Gabon
West Africa Regional Office	Forestry Research Institute of Ghana	Ghana
Indian Ocean Islands Regional Office	Parc Botanique et Zoologique de Tsimbazaza	Madagascar
Southern Africa Regional Office	National Herbarium and Botanical Gardens of Malawi	Malawi
East Africa Regional Office	Makerere University	Uganda
UK Country Office	Kew Gardens	United Kingdom
Europe Headquarters	Wageningen University	Netherlands
Africa Headquarters	World Agroforestry Centre	Kenya

== Publications ==
=== PROTA Handbook Encyclopedia Series ===
==== Description ====
The PROTA Handbook Series is a large illustrated encyclopedia series of utility plant species found in Tropical Africa. PROTA's retirement in 2013 made it unfeasible to complete the encyclopedia series, therefore only 9 volumes were ever published. In 2002, the series was projected to contain 16 volumes with entires for 7,000-8000 species. It was estimated that the series would include 2,500 botanical line drawings, and 2,500 species distribution maps in about 11,000 pages. The existing PROTA encyclopedia volumes been described metaphorically in the Kew Bulletin as a treasure trove of information. The Food and Agriculture Organization and Biodiversity International described PROTA 2: Vegetables as a detailed collection of ethnobotanical knowledge. Some PROTA encyclopedias have received more than 376 citations. PROTA Encyclopedia editors included individuals such as G.J. Grubben, who had led projects commissioned by the United Nations International Board for Plant Genetic Resources; and Ameenah Gurib-Fakim, a biodiversity scientist who later became the President of Mauritius. Though organized by species according to conventional botanical nomenclature, PROTA encyclopedias also include vernacular names in major African languages such as Swahili where information was available. PROTA continued to distribute its encyclopedias after the organization's retirement. As of 2019, than 30,000 PROTA encyclopedias had been printed in English and French and were distributed widely with the help of the Technical Centre for Agricultural and Rural Cooperation (CTA) and the now-retired Agromisa Foundation. Several PROTA encyclopedias are also available at the International Union for Conservation of Nature (IUCN) Headquarters' Library in Switzerland.

==== Content ====
Species articles in the PROTA encyclopedia series were written by hundreds of authors from around the world and in Africa, and cover a range of information including:

- plant uses
- geographic distribution by African country
- cultivation information
- wild-collection data
- production and international trade data
- chemical properties
- botanical characteristics
- ecological information
- conservation status

==== Digitization status ====
Currently, all published PROTA encyclopedias volumes have been digitized and are available as Open access publications from the Wageningen University library. Several encyclopedias in the series were planned but not started at the time of PROTA's retirement in 2013.

PROTA Encyclopedia Series
Title	Status	Year	Editors	Language
PROTA 1: Cereals and pulses	Published	2006	Brink, M. and Belay, G.	English, French
PROTA 2: Vegetables	Published	2004	Grubben, G.J. and Denton, O.A.	English, French
PROTA 3: Dyes and tannins	Published	2005	Jansen, P.C. and Cardon, D.	English, French
PROTA 4: Ornamentals	Planned	—		English, French
PROTA 5: Forages	Planned	—		English, French
PROTA 6: Fruits	Planned	—		English, French
PROTA 7(1): Timbers	Published	2008	Louppe D., Oteng-Amoaka A.A. and Brink, M.	English, French
PROTA 7(2): Timbers	Published	2012	Lemmens, R., Louppe, D., Oteng-Amoako, A.A.	English, French
PROTA 8: Carbohydrates	Planned	—		English, French
PROTA 9: Auxiliary plants	Planned	—		English, French
PROTA 10: Fuel plants	Planned	—		English, French
PROTA 11(1): Medicinal plants	Published	2008	Schmelzer, G.H. and Ameenah Gurib-Fakim	English, French
PROTA 11(2): Medicinal plants	Published	2013	Schmelzer, G.H. and Ameenah Gurib-Fakim	English, French
PROTA 12: Spices and condiments	Planned	—		English, French
PROTA 13: Essential oils and exudates	Planned	—		English, French
PROTA 14: Vegetable oils	Published	2007	van der Vossen, H.A. and Mkamilo, G.S.	English, French
PROTA 15: Stimulants	Planned	—		English, French
PROTA 16: Fibres	Published	2012	Brink, M. and Achigan-Dako, E.G.	English, French

=== Other PROTA Publications ===
Other PROTA Publications
Title	Status	Year	Digitized	Editors	Language
Plant Resources of Tropical Africa: Precursor	Published	2002	Yes	Oyen, L.P.A. and Lemmens, R.H.M.J.	English, French
PROTA: Basic list of species and commodity groupings	Published	2002	Yes	Bosch, C.H.	English, French
PROTA: Updated list of species and commodity groupings	Published	2010	Yes	Chauvet, M.	English, French
Promising African Plants: A Selection from the PROTA Programme	Published	2010	Yes	—	English, French
Proceedings of the First PROTA International Workshop	Published	2002	No	—	English, French
PROTA: African Ornamentals: Proposals and Examples	Published	2011	No	—	English, French

== Reception ==
=== PROTA2: Vegetables ===
- According to Google Scholar PROTA 2: Vegetables has been widely cited, receiving more than 367 citations as of October, 2022.
- Nigerian ethnobotanists reported in 2004 that PROTA 2: Vegetables included contributions from over 100 authors and detailed cultivation practices for 280 indigenous vegetables.
- A 2004 report from the University Of Ile-Ife in Nigeria referenced PROTA 2: Vegetables to emphasize the importance of indigenous vegetables such as Solanum macrocarpon and Telfairia occidentalis in providing employment opportunities in informal economies and in incorporating indigenous vegetables into plant breeding programs.
- A 2004 book review in the Kew Bulletin regarded PROTA 2: Vegetables as being well cited, with over 1500 references.
- A 2004 book review in the Nordic Journal of Botany commented that PROTA 2: Vegetables "should be found on the bookshelves of every institution dealing with tropical botany, nutrition, health, and agriculture"
- A 2004 book review from the Food and Agriculture Organization (FAO) and Biodiversity International said that PROTA 2: Vegetables brought needed addition to literature about vegetable resources in Africa, and that many of the vegetables described in the volume are unique to Africa. The book review also commented that PROTA2: Vegetables was particular useful for its detailed collection of ethnobotanical knowledge about both domesticated and wild-harvested vegetables in Africa.

=== PROTA3: Dyes and Tannins ===
- A 2006 book review of PROTA 3: Dyes and tannins published in Economic Botany noted that "the information contained in this volume highlights a number of lesser known species, and is a rich source of interesting information for anyone working at the interface of ethnobotany and domestication, and as such is a must have."
- About 64% of the 24 authors of PROTA 3: Dyes and tannins were from Africa.

=== PROTA11: Medicinal Plants ===
- A 2014 book review of PROTA 11(2): Medicinal Plants noted that about 30% of the contributions were written by African ethnobotanists.

== PROTA4U Database ==
The PROTA 4U Database was conceived to improve access to information in PROTA's printed publications. The PROTA web database PROTA4U is a combination of PROTA’s highly standardized expert-validated review articles (PROTAbase) and yet-to-be-validated ‘starter kits’ for all other useful plants. These ‘starter kits’ are pre-filled with basic information from PROTA’s databases SPECIESLIST (important synonyms, uses, basic sources of information) and AFRIREFS (‘grey’ literature).

Furthermore, the records contain the results of a meta-analysis from a large collection of agricultural and botanical databases, conducted successfully in cooperation with the ICON Group International. The websites, which allowed their databases to be harvested, are properly acknowledged in the ‘starter kits’.

== Debate ==
Some believe that the 2010–2012 world food price crisis and 2011 East Africa drought led to widespread interest in supporting research for intensive farming of popular food crops instead of traditional, diversified local plant resources which were the focus of PROTA. During this time, responses to these large crises in the international finance and philanthropy communities may have shifted interest away from ethnobotanical research programs like PROTA. This raises questions about the role of traditional, diversified local plant resources in the study of food security, economic development, biodiversity conservation, and the preservation of cultural heritage and traditional knowledge.

== See also ==
- Afrotropical realm
- Ecology of Africa
- International Tropical Timber Organization
- International Center for Ethnobotanical Education, Research and Service
- Neglected and underutilized crops
- African Languages
- Traditional African Medicine
- Pharmacopeia
- Bioprospecting
- Convention on Biological Diversity
- Hamilton's Pharmacopeia
- The useful plants of the Dutch East Indies

== Others ==
- Traditional Knowledge Digital Library

== External Resources ==
- Refer to the Wageningen University library for open access versions of some PROTA publications
- Refer to the Agromisa Foundation for open access publications about sustainable agriculture with a focus on small-farmers in Africa
