= Blower =

Blower may refer to:

== People ==
- Blower (surname)
- Henry Blofeld (born 1939), British sports journalist

== Other uses ==
- Blower, a fish of the family Tetraodontidae
- Blower (snake) (Heterodon platirhinos)
- Blower fan, a type of mechanical fan
- Leaf blower, a gardening tool
- Party blower, a device for making noises at a party.
- Supercharger on an internal-combustion engine
- Telephone
- USS Blower, a submarine of the United States Navy
- A device to increase the draught of a locomotive, see blastpipe

== See also ==
- Blowers, a surname
