= Supply-side environmental policy =

Climate policy

Supply-side environmental policy refers to regulations that limit or discourage the extraction of natural resources. Such a policy can replace or complement traditional demand-side environmental policy which only seeks to influence the emission level. Demand-side policies alone will typically lead to carbon leakage.

== Economic research ==
Bohm (1993) first presented an analysis where he showed that removing fossil fuel reserves from the market can be beneficial as a climate policy. Hoel (1994) subsequently showed that an optimal climate policy for a country, or a coalition of countries, is generally a combination of two policy instruments: Demand-side policies and supply-side policies.

The optimal combination of the two instruments generally depends on whether carbon leakage is largest at the demand side or the supply side. Leakage is large if the other consumers or producers react more when the fossil fuel price changes: I.e., if the price elasticity is large.

Harstad (2012) showed that a coalition of countries can benefit from purchasing and retiring fossil fuel reserves in other countries. This will both reduce the total emission and it will reduce carbon leakage on the supply side. Therefore, the coalition will subsequently benefit from reducing its own supply, rather than its demand of fossil fuel, because carbon leakage remains large on the demand side. Under fossil-fuel reserves market clearing, the outcome is first best.

Because the mechanism is stronger when many countries reduce their supply, the economic mechanism points to the benefit of a supply-side climate treaty, perhaps to complement the Paris Agreement.

Lazarus and van Asselt (2018) have discussed the challenges that must be overcome for supply-side policies to be successful at the global level.

== Politics ==
Traditional climate policies, such as the Kyoto Protocol and the Paris Agreement, have focused on the demand side. However, one motivation for supply-side policies is that this traditional approach has not successfully addressed climate change at the global level.

Erickson, Lazarus and Piggot (2018) describe the rationale for why seven countries have imposed limits on their production of fossil fuels, and they documented that also California could reduce global emissions in this way.

The Fossil Fuel Non-Proliferation Treaty Initiative builds on the idea that supply-side environmental policy can be beneficial. A similar movement, with the same rationale, is the Leave it in the ground initiative.
