= Alexander & Ilse Melamid Medal =

The Alexander & Ilse Melamid Medal was established in 2002 by a gift from Ilse Melamid. It is awarded by the American Geographical Society for "outstanding work on the dynamic relationship between human culture and natural resources."

== History ==
Alexander Melamid was a member of the American Geographical Society Council from 1975 until his death in 2001. He served as vice president from 1980 through 1992 and as Chair of the Honors Committee from 1981 throughout 1988. He was awarded the Samuel Finley Breese Morse Medal by the American Geographical Society in 1941.

Ilse Melamid was elected to the board of governors of the Graduate Faculty of Political and Social Science. She is a trustee of the Alexander and Ilse Melamid Charitable Foundation and a former registrar of the Graduate Faculty. She received her B.A. from Melbourne University, Australia.

== Recipients ==
Source: American Geographical Society

- 2025: Wendy Jepson
- 2023: Sallie Marston
- 2022: Karen Seto
- 2021: Carolyn Finney (author)
- 2020: Kendra McSweeney
- 2018: Andrew Blowers
- 2017: Diana Liverman
- 2015: Martin J. Pasqualetti
- 2013: Karl Zimmerer

== See also ==
- List of geography awards
