= Globalization and New Geographies of Conservation =

2006 book by Karl S. Zimmerer

- Editor: Karl Zimmerer
- Language: English
- Subject: Environmental globalization, globalization, environmental conservation, environmental governance, conservation geography
- Publisher: University of Chicago Press
- Publication date: 2006
- Publication place: United States
- Pages: 357
- Awards: The Kellett Mid-Career Award (2006)
- ISBN: 978-0-226-98344-8

Globalization and New Geographies of Conservation is a 2006 edited volume by American geographer Karl Zimmerer. The book brings together twelve case studies of the geographic dimensions of environmental conservation in the context of globalization across Latin America, Africa, and Asia based on the 2002 "Spaces of Hope" conference at the University of Wisconsin–Madison. It shows how the globalization of conservation since the 1980s has expanded severalfold the worldwide numbers and territorial areas of Protected Areas, incorporating extensive humanized landscapes, shifting the scales of environmental governance, enlarging new transboundary protected area and management, and relying on widespread decentralization, community-based conservation, and local public participation. Research for the thematic design of the conference and book were supported by the Kellett Mid-Career Award that Zimmerer received in 2002.

== Summary ==
Zimmerer’s volume investigates the evolving relations among globalization processes and environmental conservation. Rapid global political, ecological, socioeconomic, and cultural transformations have propelled far-reaching changes in conservation through changing geographic dynamics. In turn, this new suite of spatial and human-environment dynamics of conservation becomes essential in understanding contemporary globalization, environmental globalization, and the high-priority challenges of global social-environmental change such as the biodiversity crisis, sustainable development, climate change, and environmental governance.

Zimmerer introduces a novel theoretical framework for understanding environmental conservation not as completely neutral forms of science, policy, and management but as fundamentally geographical phenomena shaped by politics and power. The book’s ample Introduction highlights the globalized expansion of Protected Areas worldwide to more than 15 million km^{2} by 2004 from the earlier coverage of 1.0 million km^{2} in the 1970s.

Zimmerer highlights this spatial expansion of the "global conservation boom" by tracing the globalization approaches of the large, influential conservation non-governmental organizations (NGOs) headquartered in the United States and Europe. Other globalization forces have included so-called Washington Consensus of political and economic institutions that has been used to facilitate the global expansion of conservation, even while its main agenda promotes US-led global neoliberalism and structural adjustment. The book’s cover image of the "Spiral Jetty," a project of land artist and sculptor Robert Smithson, reflects the tension among these diverse elements of the global conservation boom.

The first main section of Zimmerer’s volume examines place-based case studies of what he terms the "new spatialities of the global conservation boom": the complex webs of spatial relations that link global drivers through crucial networks and governance to local communities and changes. The new spatialities in these case studies extend from the diverse global institutions and state-level institutions of the countries of the Global South to the local territories, land use, and relations to nature of indigenous people, forest-dependent communities, and small farmer and food organizations. The crucial roles of these people in the new spatialities of conservation are revealed in the case studies of the multi-use conservation buffer zones of Protected Areas that are globally governed and the landscapes subjected to the global-scale governance of sustainability standards and certification.

The volume’s later sections analyze three additional geographic modes that play key roles in the relations among globalization processes and environmental conservation. "Linking Scales" analyzes place-based case studies of extensively humanized livelihoods and landscapes. Examples include the multi-scale seed systems of biodiverse food known as agrobiodiversity or agricultural biodiversity that are commonly run by local women and that have become an increased focus in the expanded globalization of environmental conservation. The next section on "Transnational and Border Issues" analyzes case studies of globalization-expanded transboundary and national/transnational conservation and governance. The last section on "Decentralization and Environmental Governance" examines case studies of the rapidly expanded, widespread trends toward community-based conservation in conjunction with the globalization of environmental conservation.

In the Conclusion, Zimmerer highlights the spaces of hope in the globalization-driven expansion of parks, reserves, and other Protected Areas and their extensive interfaces with the land use, livelihoods, and worked landscapes of local communities. While recognizing limitations and counterforces such as fortress conservation, diverse spaces of hope have emerged in genuine conservation co-governance and local power-based partnering with farmer and food organizations, indigenous and small-farmer groups, and migrants and rural-urban associations.

The legacy of this volume includes the applicability of its ideas to the global expansion of marine Protected Areas that accelerated in the 2010s. Its legacy is similarly evident in the vigorously proposed 30x30 expansion of global biodiversity-conservation areas by 2030. In geography and related fields, the volume’s globalization-and-new-geographies framework anticipated a series of subsequent works on the globalization and new geographies of urbanization, energy, food, agriculture, water, and waste.

== Reviews ==
Anthony Bebbington found the book to be exceptionally coherent and welcomed the inclusion of scholars at early career stages bringing fresh arguments and empirical material. Bebbington described the volume as "a very welcome contribution to the literature" that helps chart and dissect the changes brought by international conservation organizations and the "new rules for the governance of landscape and resource use" they have introduced.

John Schelhas and Max J. Pfeffer described the volume as "exceptionally coherent." They praised Zimmerer for assembling papers that take "a clear look at just what is happening at specific places in an era of globalized conservation." Schelhas and Pfeffer regarded the concepts and case studies as "one of the most successful recent discussions of conservation that is empirically grounded, theoretically robust, and of practical value."

Dianne Rocheleau praised the integration of agrarian biodiversity, parks, and reserves in a single conservation framework, and found the treatment of mobility, scale, and networks across the case studies to be illuminating. She considered it "an important and insightful milestone in a larger conversation" and a "critical step" in new international conservation geography, while noting the need for more in-depth analysis.

In his review, Tom Rudel commended the "finely wrought set of essays that teach us a lot about contemporary conservation practices in the Global South." Rudel noted that the authors clearly knew the study regions and effectively conveyed their knowledge. He observed that future attention is needed to large-scale resource exploitation.

Thomas Harvey called the volume "agenda-setting" and praised it as a state-of-the-art contribution unpacking globalization as "a dialectical process of worldwide functional integration in a range of human practices along with intense differentiation." Harvey notes the book delivers more than the sum of its parts.

For Aileen Hoath, the volume sits within the broader discourse on third-wave conservation, identifying practical solutions at the interface between conservation spatialities and smallholder agriculture.

John O. Browder also situated his review in the global shift to third-wave conservation, noting its focus on "recent geographical research on environmental conservation in the Third Wave."

Nancy Woodfield-Pascoe summarized the book as offering a "suite of design tools" for understanding how environmental conservation is achieved. Woodfield-Pascoe notes that future work needs to address the growing global importance of marine Protected Areas.

Jeffrey A. McNeely concluded that the book "is particularly useful in identifying globalization as a fundamental force in driving land use in virtually all parts of the world."

The CenTREAD Working Group acknowledged the volume as "a useful conceptual map of the emerging nexus between globalization and conservation in the global South" and praised its methodological and geographic diversity.
