= Tropical wood =

Tropical wood may refer to either

- Tropical and subtropical moist broadleaf forests
- Tropical timber, a forestry product grown in those forests
