= Leakage (economics) =

Diversion of funds from iterative processes

In economics, a leakage is a diversion of funds from some iterative process. For example, in the Keynesian depiction of the circular flow of income and expenditure, leakages are the non-consumption uses of income, including saving, taxes, and imports. In this model, leakages are equal in quantity to injections of spending from outside the flow at the equilibrium aggregate output. The model is best viewed as a circular flow between national income, output, consumption, and factor payments. Savings, taxes, and imports are "leaked" out of the main flow, reducing the money available in the rest of the economy. Imported goods are one way this may happen, transferring money earned in the country to another one.

The simplest possible model of credit creation assumes all loans borrowed from banks in a fractional-reserve banking system are re-deposited to the system. This allows simple calculation of the amount of credit created. In practice, though, cash leakages occur in the form of sums of money borrowed from banks but not re-deposited, and in the form of funds deposited in banks but not lent out. Cash leakage, in this case, lowers the ability of credit creation.

Leakage is a common problem involving TNCs (Transnational corporations). Large companies have factories or production facilities in less developed countries, these factories create wealth for the company which is then not transferred to the economy of the host country and instead to that of the corporation involved. The economic value of goods and/or profits lost here is leakage.

== See also ==
- Carbon leakage – also known as emissions leakage
- Leakage effect – the loss of tourist revenue from a country
