= Biological globalization =

Translocation of species for human benefit

Biological globalization refers to the phenomenon where domesticated species are brought and cultivated in other favorable environments, facilitated by and for the benefit of humans. It has been defined as "the spread of plants domesticated in one area to favorable environments around the world". A growing and changing human population plays an important part on what plants are moved to new locations and which are left untouched.

There have been examples of biological globalization dating back to 3000 BCE, but the most famous example is more recent, namely the Columbian Exchange. There have been many benefits to this movement of biological material around the world, a main one being the globalization of food production, so that countries can take advantage of the different growing seasons to ensure the availability of certain food crops year-round.

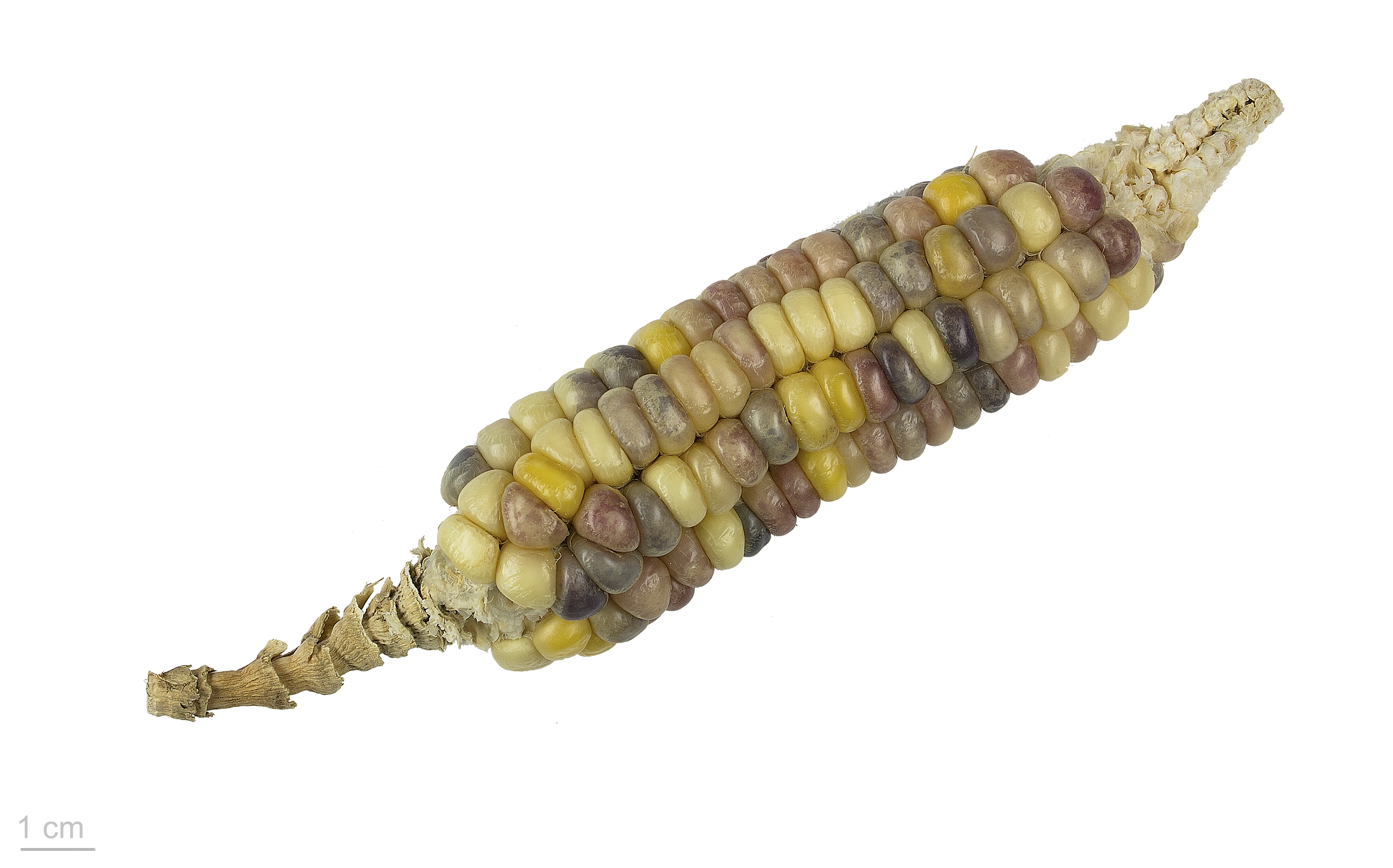
Corn, similar to a type that would have been seen in the days of the Columbian Exchange.

== Early history ==
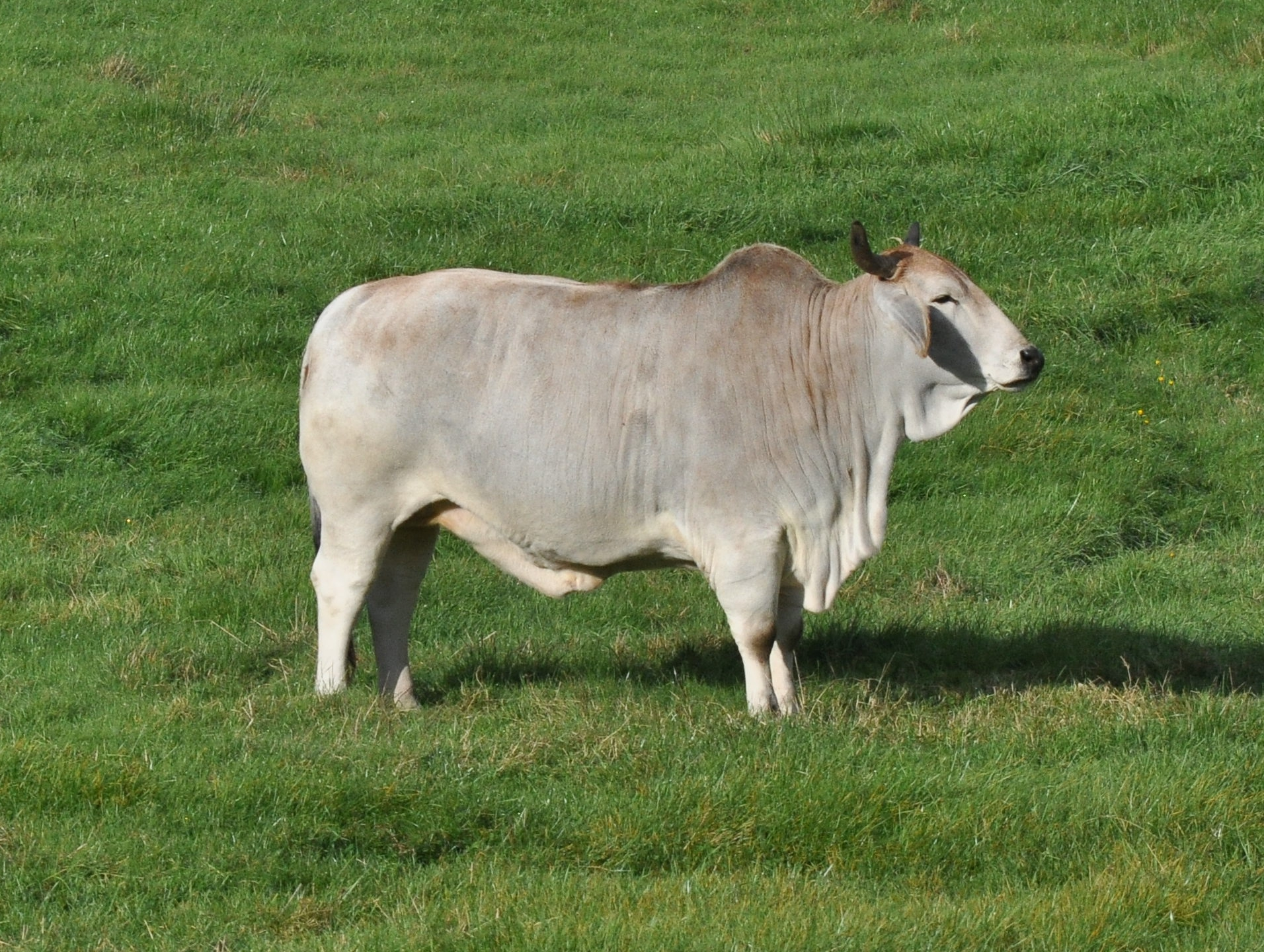
A Zebu, originally from South Asia, now common in Africa

Introduced species are often seen as a negative thing now, but it has diversified diets, improved human health, domesticated landscapes, and sometimes increased biodiversity. Biological globalization is not only a phenomenon of recent times, the big considerations are for the Columbian exchange, but there have been purposeful translocations long before that. Deliberate translocations included for crops, food, sport, military use and study. Also as exotic diplomatic gifts as novelties, as pest control and to cross-breed. Though alongside deliberate introductions came hitchhikers, which had the potential to become invasive. Many trade routes that we use today were used in the ancient worlds, especially between Asia, Europe, the Middle-East, Africa and India, and the overland routes of Asia were known as ‘the Trans-Eurasian Exchange’.

=== Translocation of domestic animals ===
An early example is the spread of domesticated zebu, a species of cattle, which originated in South Asia and was introduced to Mesopotamia and Arabia in 3000 BCE, then on to the central plains of Asia and China in 1500 BCE, and Africa by 600 BCE. The zebu is now the most common type of cattle found in East Africa.

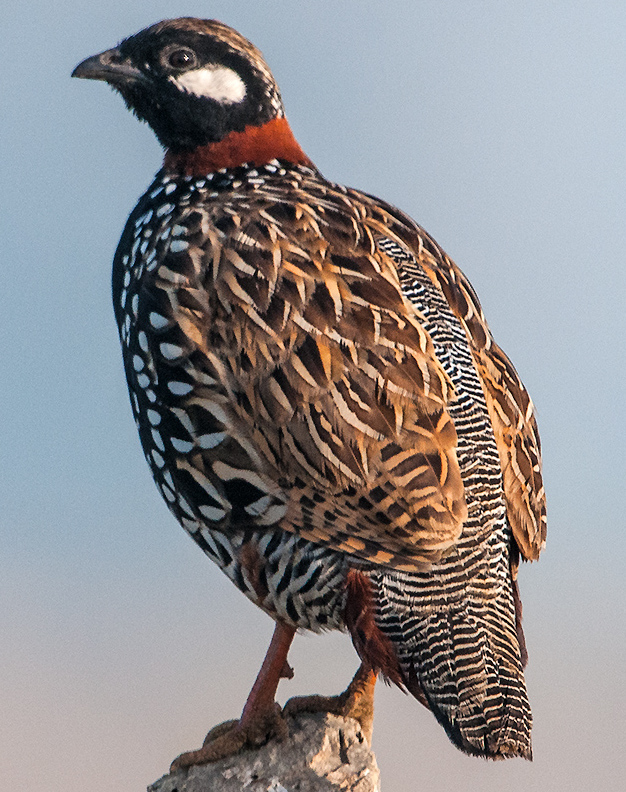
A Black Francolin, brought to the Mediterranean from South Asia in early CE as a game bird

=== Translocation of birds ===
Some species were introduced by humans so long ago, that it is hard to tell if they are native or not. The influence of the European aristocracy can be seen nowadays, from their love of importing exotic plants and animals, that have been around for so long that they seem native. The black francolin (Francolinus francolinus) was documented as living in the Mediterranean from the time of Pliny the Elder (1st century CE), and so was thought to be a native species. It was prized during the renaissance and medieval times as a gamebird. Through DNA tracing and historical documents, it was found that it originated in Asia, maybe even South East Asia, through various trade routes. This is an example of how wealthy people have been doing these translocations for a long time.

The spread of exotic birds for the menageries of wealthy people has been especially wide spread, like the peacock from Asia to Greece in the time of Alexander the Great, and the Chukar partridge along the silk road in early BC.

=== Translocation of plant crops ===
The spread of stone fruits (peaches, plums and cherries) has been tracked from China to Europe, as well as citrus fruits from South East Asia to Europe in Roman and Medieval times. Apples and pears came from South East Asia to China around 400 BCE.

== Modern globalization ==
=== The Columbian Exchange ===
When the New world was colonized by the Old around 1500 CE there was a major movement of cultivated crops, which was known as the Columbian Exchange. The Old world brought back seeds for foods such as corn, peppers, tomatoes and pineapples. In exchange, Europeans brought with them apples, pears, stone and citrus fruits, bananas and coconuts. Nowadays, the United States is a major exporter of many of these transplants for food and ornamental value, such as peaches, grapes, and citrus. The classic American homesteading symbol, the apple tree, actually had two or three major translocation events: Originating in South East Asia and spreading to China around 400 BCE, making its way to Europe, and then brought over by Europeans to North America as it was colonized.

=== Ornamental ===
There has also been a movement of ornamental plants in recent centuries, as it became fashionable for Europe's elite to have extensive gardens. This included tulips from Turkey making their way to the Netherlands in the 17th and 18th centuries, causing the tulip craze, and Bermuda grass from Africa becoming the symbol of the American middle-class.

=== Wheat ===
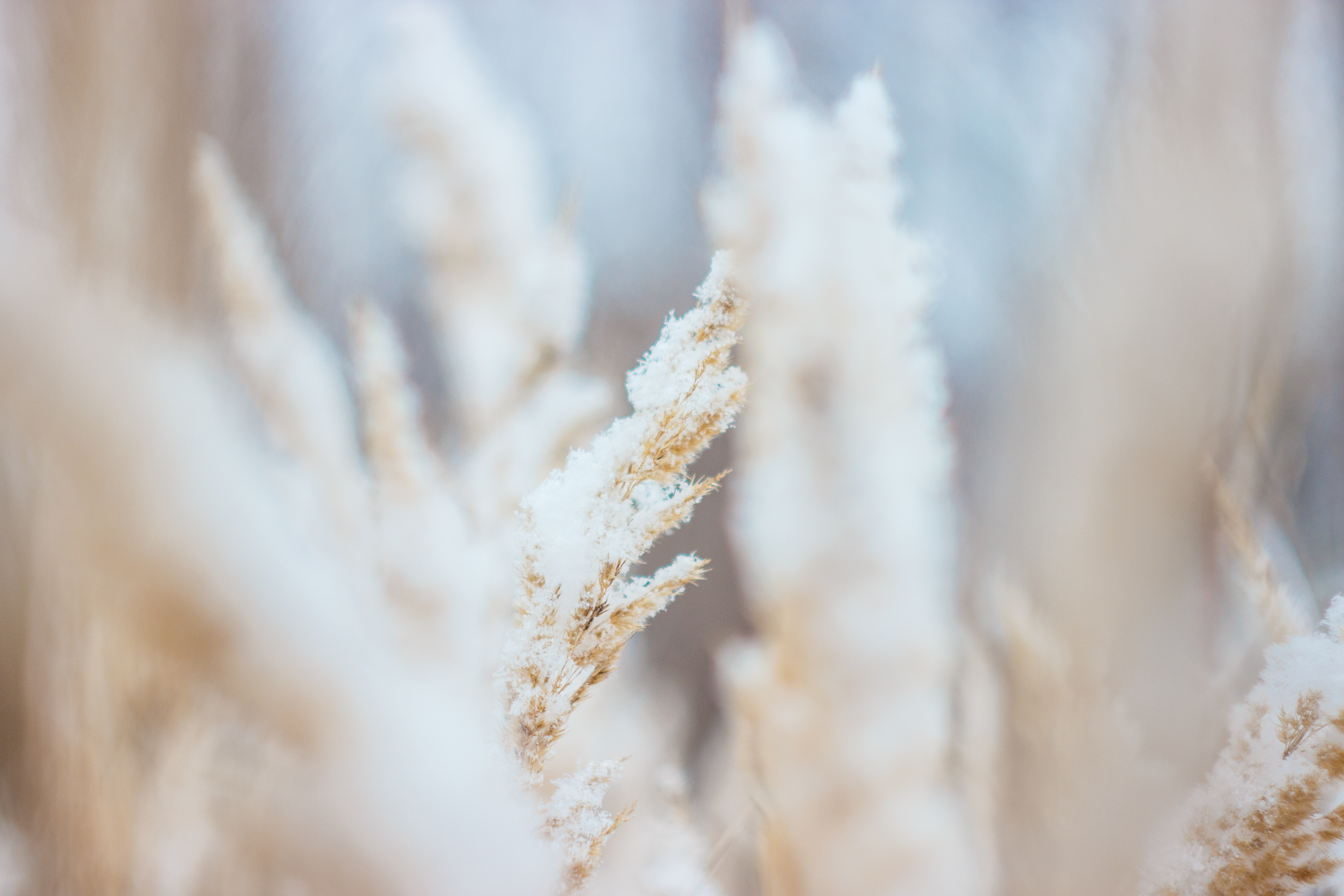
Snow covered wheat, wheat has been bred to have a wider range of climactic tolerances by globalization.

Alongside the transportation innovations of globalization, the spread of biological technology has allowed the world to enter a new global economy. Because agriculture is such a huge economic sector it is large portion of the economy, and a large portion of that is the production of wheat in the last few centuries. Technically wheat is an invasive species in most of the countries it is grown, but because it is economically important to humans we don't classify it as such. In a way, biological globalization allowed for the economic growth of many countries on the global scale, like America and Ukraine, where wheat became a huge export. Innovations in breeding have allowed wheat to spread from milder coastal areas to harsh interior regions such as the sweeping plains of the Midwestern US, and into colder climates like Canada and Russia. The selective breeding and hardiness of the North American wheat varieties were then used by the Old world farmers to cross-breed with their varieties, and this began a back-and-forth of genetics to improve the wheat strains world-wide.

== See also ==
- Environmental globalization
- Invasive species
- Columbian Exchange
