= Blower (surname) =

Blower is a surname, and may refer to:

- Christine Blower (born 1951), trade unionist
- Maurice Blower (1894–1982), British composer
- Michael Blower (born 1929), British architect
- Tom Blower (1914–1955), British swimmer

The surname "Blower" (sometimes "Blowers" or "Blow") referred to a worker who operated bellows, normally in smithies. Blowers also were needed in churches to power church organs. The term has also been used to refer to horn players, who might work with hunters, in the army, or as musicians.

== See also ==
- Blowers
