= Kendra McSweeney =

Canadian geographer

Kendra McSweeney is a Canadian geographer who researches human-environment interaction and political ecology. She is a professor at Ohio State University.

== Life ==
McSweeney earned a B.A. (1991) in geography and environmental studies and a Ph.D. (2000) in geography at McGill University. She received a M.Sc. in geography at the University of Tennessee in 1993.

McSweeney's research focuses on human-environment interaction and political ecology. She joined Ohio State University in 2001 as an assistant professor of geography. She was promoted to associate professor in 2007 and professor in 2015. McSweeney won the Alexander & Ilse Melamid Medal in 2020. In 2023, she was elected a fellow of the American Association for the Advancement of Science.
