= Environmental governance =

Concept in political ecology and environmental policy

Environmental governance are the processes of decision-making involved in the control and management of the environment and natural resources. These processes includes government, business and civil society. Environmental governance may also refer to a concept in political ecology which promotes environmental policy that advocates for sustainable human activity (i.e. that governance should be based upon environmental principles).

== Definitions ==
Environmental governance refers to the processes of decision-making involved in the control and management of the environment and natural resources. International Union for Conservation of Nature (IUCN), define environmental governance as the "multi-level interactions (i.e., local, national, international/global) among, but not limited to, three main actors, i.e., state, market, and civil society, which interact with one another, whether in formal and informal ways; in formulating and implementing policies in response to environment-related demands and inputs from the society; bound by rules, procedures, processes, and widely accepted behavior; possessing characteristics of "good governance"; for the purpose of attaining environmentally-sustainable development" (IUCN 2014).

Key principles of environmental governance include:

- Embedding the environment in all levels of decision-making and action
- Conceptualizing cities and communities, economic and political life as a subset of the environment
- Emphasizing the connection of people to the ecosystems in which they live
- Promoting the transition from open-loop/cradle-to-grave systems (like garbage disposal with no recycling) to closed-loop/cradle-to-cradle systems (like permaculture and zero waste strategies).

== Challenges ==
Challenges facing environmental governance include:

- Inadequate continental and global agreements
- Unresolved tensions between maximum development, sustainable development and maximum protection, limiting funding, damaging links with the economy and limiting application of Multilateral Environment Agreements (MEAs).
- Environmental funding is not self-sustaining, diverting resources from problem-solving into funding battles.
- Lack of integration of sector policies
- Inadequate institutional capacities
- Ill-defined priorities
- Unclear objectives
- Lack of coordination within the UN, governments, the private sector and civil society
- Lack of shared vision
- Interdependencies among development/sustainable economic growth, trade, agriculture, health, peace and security.
- International imbalance between environmental governance and trade and finance programs, e.g., World Trade Organization (WTO).
- Limited credit for organizations running projects within the Global Environment Facility (GEF)
- Linking UNEP, United Nations Development Programme (UNDP) and the World Bank with MEAs
- Lack of government capacity to satisfy MEA obligations
- Absence of the gender perspective and equity in environmental governance
- Inability to influence public opinion
- Time lag between human action and environmental effect, sometimes as long as a generation
- Environmental problems being embedded in very complex systems, of which our understanding is still quite weak

All of these challenges have implications on governance, however international environmental governance is necessary. The IDDRI claims that rejection of multilateralism in the name of efficiency and protection of national interests conflicts with the promotion of international law and the concept of global public goods. Others cite the complex nature of environmental problems.

On the other hand, The Agenda 21 program has been implemented in over 7,000 communities. Environmental problems, including global-scale problems, may not always require global solutions. For example, marine pollution can be tackled regionally, and ecosystem deterioration can be addressed locally. Other global problems such as climate change benefit from local and regional action.

=== Issues of scale ===
==== Multi-tier governance ====
The literature on governance scale shows how changes in the understanding of environmental issues have led to the movement from a local view to recognising their larger and more complicated scale. This move brought an increase in the diversity, specificity and complexity of initiatives. Meadowcroft pointed out innovations that were layered on top of existing structures and processes, instead of replacing them.

Lafferty and Meadowcroft give three examples of multi-tiered governance: internationalisation, increasingly comprehensive approaches, and involvement of multiple governmental entities. Lafferty and Meadowcroft described the resulting multi-tiered system as addressing issues on both smaller and wider scales.

==== Institutional fit ====
Hans Bruyninckx claimed that a mismatch between the scale of the environmental problem and the level of the policy intervention was problematic. Young claimed that such mismatches reduced the effectiveness of interventions. Most of the literature addresses the level of governance rather than ecological scale.

Elinor Ostrom, amongst others, claimed that the mismatch is often the cause of unsustainable management practices and that simple solutions to the mismatch have not been identified.

== Scales ==
=== At the local level ===
Local authorities are confronted with similar sustainability and environmental problems all over the world. Environmental challenges for cities include for example air pollution, heat waves, complex supply chains, and recycling systems. Some cities, especially megacities in the global South, are rapidly growing—putting an additional stress on them.

Cities and their governments have a growing importance in global policymaking. They can be spaces for creative responses to global problems, sites of new policy cultures with less hierarchical structures, and hubs for innovation. Cities can conduct local sustainability projects and join forces in global coalitions, such as the Global Resilient Cities Network or Local Governments for Sustainability (ICLEI), in regional clusters, such as Energy Cities or the ASEAN Smart Cities Network. However, to conduct sustainability projects on the ground, cities and local governments rely on regional and national governments, international funding schemes, civil society engagement, and private corporations that all operate in the multi-level governance system.

A 1997 report observed a global consensus that sustainable development implementation should be based on local level solutions and initiatives designed with and by the local communities. Community participation and partnership along with the decentralisation of government power to local communities are important aspects of environmental governance at the local level. Initiatives such as these are integral divergence from earlier environmental governance approaches which was "driven by state agendas and resource control" and followed a top-down or trickle down approach rather than the bottom up approach that local level governance encompasses. The adoption of practices or interventions at a local scale can, in part, be explained by diffusion of innovation theory.

=== At state level ===
States play a crucial role in environmental governance, because "however far and fast international economic integration proceeds, political authority remains vested in national governments". It is for this reason that governments should respect and support the commitment to implementation of international agreements.

At the state level, environmental management has been found to be conducive to the creation of roundtables and committees. In France, the Grenelle de l'environnement process:

- included a variety of actors (e.g. the state, political leaders, unions, businesses, not-for-profit organizations and environmental protection foundations);
- allowed stakeholders to interact with the legislative and executive powers in office as indispensable advisors;
- worked to integrate other institutions, particularly the Economic and Social Council, to form a pressure group that participated in the process for creating an environmental governance model;
- attempted to link with environmental management at regional and local levels.

If environmental issues are excluded from e.g., the economic agenda, this may delegitimize those institutions.

=== At the global level ===
The most pressing transboundary environmental challenges include climate change, biodiversity loss, and land degradation.

A publication of 2020 described global environmental governance as "one of the institutionally most dynamic areas in world politics" in the last thirty years. Numerous new international institutions and actors have emerged in this field since the 1970s. This growth has resulted in overlapping institutional roles, contributing to both fragmentation and complexity. However, it also creates opportunities for cooperation and productive interactions between institutions, involving multiple actors and levels of governance.

== Example thematic issues at the local level ==
=== Biodiversity ===
Environmental governance for protecting the biodiversity has to act in many levels. Biodiversity is fragile because it is threatened by almost all human actions. To promote conservation of biodiversity, agreements and laws have to be created to regulate agricultural activities, urban growth, industrialization of countries, use of natural resources, control of invasive species, the correct use of water and protection of air quality.

To promote environmental governance for biodiversity protection there has to be a clear articulation between values and interests while negotiating environmental management plans.

Research has also highlighted the importance of governance quality in determining biodiversity outcomes. A 2018 global study published in Nature analyzed population trends of 461 species of waterbirds across more than 25,000 sites and found that strong environmental governance was one of the most reliable predictors of conservation success. Regions with higher governance effectiveness, such as parts of Europe and North America, generally showed stable or increasing bird populations, whereas areas with weaker governance—particularly in Central Asia, Sub-Saharan Africa, and South America—experienced significant declines. These findings suggest that conservation strategies must address institutional and political factors, not just ecological ones, to effectively protect biodiversity, especially in wetland ecosystems.

Many governments have conserved portions of their territories under the Convention on Biological Diversity (CBD), a multilateral treaty signed in 1992–3. The 20 Aichi Biodiversity Targets are part of the CBD's Strategic Plan 2011–2020 and were published in 2010. Aichi Target Number 11 aimed to protect 17% of terrestrial and inland water areas and 10% of coastal and marine areas by 2020 .

Of the 20 biodiversity goals laid out by the Aichi Biodiversity Targets in 2010, only six were partially achieved by 2020. The 2020 CBD report highlighted that if the status quo does not change, biodiversity will continue to decline due to "currently unsustainable patterns of production and consumption, population growth and technological developments". The report also singled out Australia, Brazil, Cameroon and the Galapagos Islands (Ecuador) for having had one of its animals lost to extinction in the previous ten years.

Following this, the leaders of 64 nations and the European Union pledged to halt environmental degradation and restore the natural world. The pledge was not signed by leaders from some of the world's biggest polluters, namely China, India, Russia, Brazil and the United States. Some experts contend that the United States' refusal to ratify the Convention on Biological Diversity is harming global efforts to halt the extinction crisis.

Scientists say that even if the targets for 2020 had been met, no substantial reduction of extinction rates would likely have resulted. Others have raised concerns that the Convention on Biological Diversity does not go far enough, and argue the goal should be zero extinctions by 2050, along with cutting the impact of unsustainable food production on nature by half. That the targets are not legally binding has also been subject to criticism.

In December 2022, every country except the United States and the Holy See signed onto the Kunming-Montreal Global Biodiversity Framework at the 2022 United Nations Biodiversity Conference.This framework calls for protecting 30% of land and oceans by 2030 (30 by 30). It also has 22 other targets intended to reduce biodiversity loss. At the time of signing the agreement, only 17% of land territory and 10% of ocean territory were protected. The agreement includes protecting the rights of Indigenous peoples and changing the current subsidy policy to one better for biodiversity protection, but it takes a step backward in protecting species from extinction in comparison to the Aichi Targets. Critics said the agreement does not go far enough to protect biodiversity, and that the process was rushed.

=== Socio-environmental conflicts ===
Environmental issues such as natural resource management and climate change have security and social considerations. Drinking water scarcity and climate change can cause mass migrations of climate refugees, for example.

Social network analysis has been applied to understand how different actors cooperate and conflict in environmental governance. Existing relationships can influence how stakeholders collaborate during times of conflict: a study of transportation planning and land use in California found that stakeholders choose their collaborative partners by avoiding those with the most dissimilar beliefs, rather than by selecting for those with shared views. The result is known as homophily—actors with similar views are more likely to end up collaborating than those with opposing views.

== See also ==
- Climate governance
- Earth system governance
- Environmental globalization
- Environmental policy
- Environmental politics
- Environmental racism
- Environmental, social, and governance
- Ocean governance
- Political ecology
