= Blowers =

Blowers is a surname, and may refer to:

- Andrew Blowers (born 1975), New Zealand rugby union player
- Andrew Thomas Blowers, British geographer and environmentalist
- Bruce G. Blowers (born 1987), American singer-songwriter
- John G. Blowers Jr. (1911–2006), American drummer
- Mike Blowers (born 1965), American baseball player
- Sampson Salter Blowers (1742–1842), American lawyer
- Sean Blowers (born 1961), English actor
- Blowers, nickname of Henry Blofeld (born 1939), British sports journalist

== See also ==
- Blower (disambiguation)
