= Carolyn Finney (author) =

American author

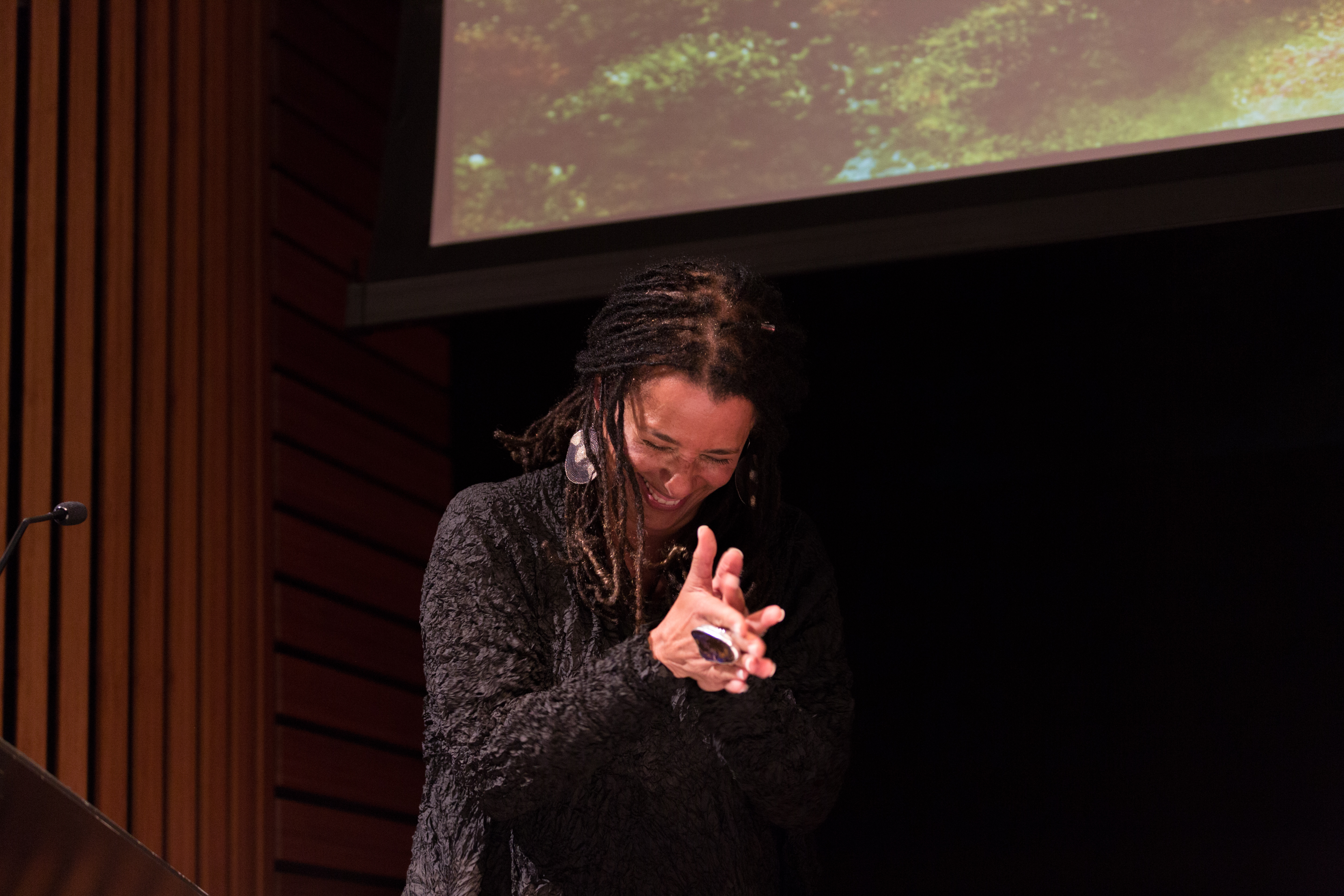
- Education: Ph.D. in Cultural Geography, Clark University
- Occupations: Speaker and author. Formerly Assistant Professor, University of Kentucky
- Awards: Fulbright Scholar, Canon National Parks Science Scholars Fellowship, Mellon Postdoctoral Fellowship

Carolyn Finney (born 1959), is a storyteller, author, artist, educator, and currently a scholar-in-residence in the Franklin Environmental Center at Middlebury College. Finney's work reveals how nature and the environment are racialized in America.

== Background ==
Finney was raised in Westchester County, New York, where her father and mother, from Floyd, Virginia, tended the private weekend estate of a wealthy Jewish family as caretaker and housekeeper. They, including her two siblings, were the only family of color in the area. Finney began a liberal arts degree but dropped out to pursue a career in acting. For 11 years she worked in television (commercials, and 5 episodes of the Beauty and the Beast (1987 TV series)). She then spent five years backpacking through Africa, Asia and Europe, and living in Nepal. Finney completed her Bachelors of Arts at Fairhaven College at Western Washington University in gender and international development, a Masters of Social Science at Utah State University focusing on international rural community development, and a Ph.D. in Geography at Clark University supervised by Dianne Rocheleau.

From 2007-2014 she was Assistant Professor in the College of Natural Resources at the University of California, Berkeley, the only African American out of 75 faculty members in 2007. She was denied tenure, sparking widespread protest and initiatives. She moved to the University of Kentucky before leaving academia. She now engages with a wide variety of organizations, institutions and community groups as a public speaker, visiting academic, consultant, advisor and writer.

== Media ==
Finney has done interviews with diverse media platforms including, The Tavis Smiley Show, MSNBC, NPR, Vice News Tonight and podcasts such as the Meat Eater Hunting Collective podcast, Unladylike podcast, and the Bike Nerds podcast where she shared her insights on race and environment in the U.S. Finney's podcasts can be found on Spotify, Apple Podcast, Google Play, IHeartRadio and YouTube. As social media use increased and many events became virtual during the pandemic, Finney transitioned to Zoom (software) as well as Cisco web and Google Meets to continue her livestreams and answer audience questions in real time.

== Scholarship and Publications ==
In 2014, Finney published her first book, "Black Faces, White Spaces: Reimagining the Relationship of African Americans to the Great Outdoors," which centers on the experience of African Americans and the environment in the U.S. and its mainstream environmental movement. She argues that African Americans have frequently overcome barriers to the outdoors and why this reality has been ignored in both popular imagination and historical record. Finney analyzes the disconnect between America’s understanding of nature during the environmental movement of the mid-20th century and the collective experiences of nature of Black people, and writes that their relationship with the outdoors has been historically dictated for them. Demand for her book increased significantly during the pandemic, resulting in requests for public speaking, consultancy, and creative projects.

Finney has written many articles for Newsweek, The Guardian and Outside magazine and is a columnist for The Earth Island Journal.

== Current projects ==
At present, Finney is working on her one-woman show, The N Word: Nature, Revisited, is an imagined conversation with John Muir which was presented at the New York Botanical Gardens Humanities Institute in the summer of 2021 as part of her Mellon residency. In addition, Finney is working with Emmy-award winning documentary film-maker Irene Taylor (Vermilion Films) who is including her family’s story in an upcoming HBO documentary about humans' complex relationship to trees. She is working on a new book of creative nonfiction that takes a more personal journey into understanding the very complicated relationship between race, land and belonging in the U.S.

== Recognition ==
Finney has been a Fulbright Scholar (2001), a Canon National Parks Science Scholar (2003), and received a Mellon Postdoctoral Fellowship in Environmental Studies at Wellesley College.

== Selected publications ==
- Finney, C. 2020. "The Perils of Being Black in Public: We are all Christian Cooper and George Floyd". The Guardian.
- Finney, C. 2020. "Self-Evident: Reflections on the Invisibility of Black Bodies in Environmental Histories". BESIDE Magazine, Montreal.
- Finney, C. 2019. "This Moment". River Rail: Occupy Colby.
- Finney, C. 2019. "A Thousand Oceans". Geographical Research, Wiley Pub.
- Finney, C. 2018. "The Space Between the Words". Harvard Design Journal.
- Finney, C. 2014. Black Faces, White Spaces: Reimagining the Relationship of African Americans to the Great Outdoors. University of North Carolina Press.
- Finney, C. 2014. "Doing it Old School: Reflections on Giving Back". Journal of Research Practice Athabasca University Press, Canada
- Finney, C. 2013. "Ode to New York: A Performance Piece". Center for Humans and Nature.
- Finney, C. 2013. "Brave New World? Ruminations on Race in the 21st Century". Antipode (early view online Wiley-Blackwell).
- Finney, C. 2012. "Child’s Play: Finding the Green in the In Between". In Companions in Wonder: Reflections on Children and Adults Exploring Nature, Julie Dunlap and Steven Kellert (eds.). MIT Press.
