= Tropical timber =

Type of timber or wood

Tropical timber may refer to any type of timber or wood that grows in tropical rainforests and tropical and subtropical moist broadleaf forests and is harvested there. Typical examples of worldwide industrial significance include, among others, the following hardwoods:

- Chloroxylon
- Ebony
- Mahogany
- Narra
- Rosewood
- Teak

Overexploitation of those woods has led to widespread deforestation in the tropics. The intergovernmental organization International Tropical Timber Organization is concerned with conservation of the habitats of tropical timber trees.

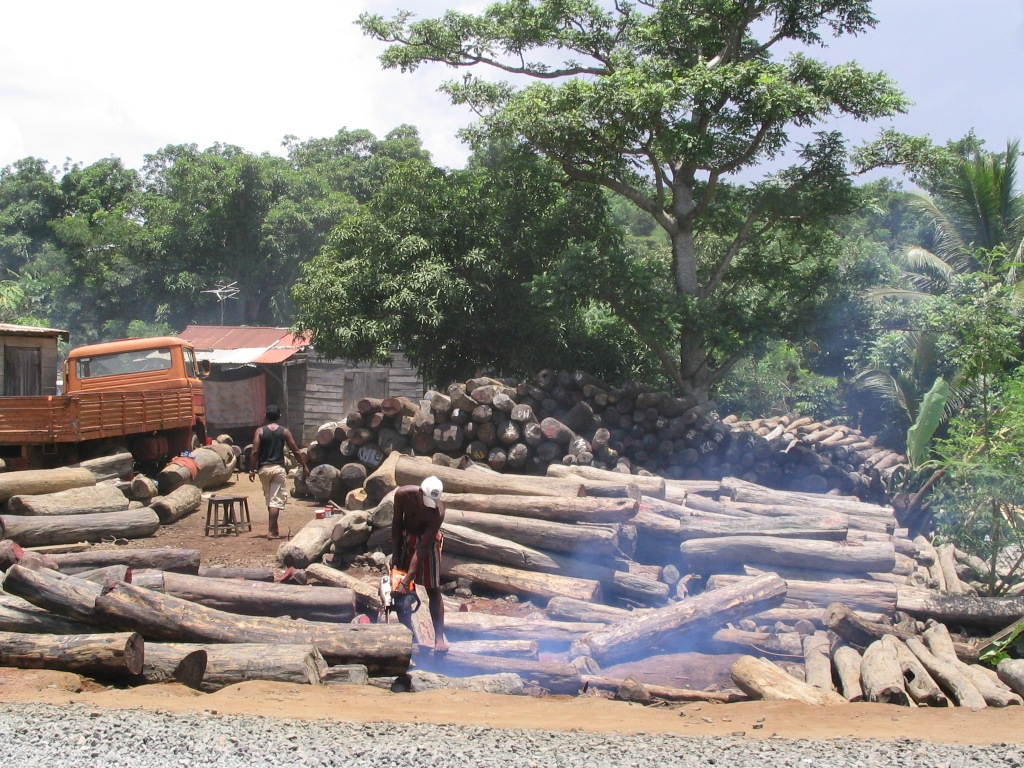
Illegal logging in Madagascar. In 2009, the vast majority of the illegally obtained rosewood was exported to China.

== See also ==
- CITES
- Forest Stewardship Council
- Forestry
- International Tropical Timber Agreement, 2006
- Plant Resources of Tropical Africa
- Tropical forest
- Tropical Timber 83
- Tropical Timber 94
