= Carbon leakage =

Unintended increase in greenhouse gas emissions

Carbon leakage is a concept to quantify an increase in greenhouse gas emissions in one country as a result of an emissions reduction by a second country with stricter climate change mitigation policies. Carbon leakage is one type of spill-over effect. Spill-over effects can be positive or negative; for example, emission reductions policy might lead to technological developments that aid reductions outside of the policy area. Carbon leakage can be defined as "the increase in CO_{2} emissions outside the countries taking domestic mitigation action divided by the reduction in the emissions of these countries." It is expressed as a percentage, and can be greater or less than 100%. There is no consensus over the magnitude of long-term leakage effects.

Carbon leakage may occur for a number of reasons: if the climate policies of a country raise local costs, then another country with more relaxed policies may have a trading advantage. If demand for these goods remains the same, production may move offshore to the cheaper country with lower standards, and global emissions will not be reduced. Moreover, if environmental policies in one country add a premium to certain fuels or commodities, then the demand may decline and their price may fall. Countries that do not place a premium on those items may then take up the demand and use the same supply, negating any benefit. In the case of transboundary economic activities such as maritime transport, carbon leakage can take various forms—for example, ships may call at intermediate ports to circumvent climate regulations or increase their sailing speed outside regulated zones, resulting in higher overall emissions.

== Coal, oil and alternative technologies ==
The issue of carbon leakage can be interpreted from the perspective of the reliance of society on coal, oil, and alternative (less polluting) technologies, e.g., biomass. This is based on the theory of nonrenewable resources. The potential emissions from coal, oil and gas is limited by the supply of these nonrenewable resources. To a first approximation, the total emissions from oil and gas is fixed, and the total load of carbon in the atmosphere is primarily determined by coal usage.

A policy that sets a carbon tax only in developed countries might lead to leakage of emissions to developing countries. However, a negative leakage (i.e., leakage having the effect of reducing emissions) could also occur due to a lowering in demand and price for oil and gas. One of the negative effects of carbon leakage is the undermining of global emissions reduction efforts. When industries relocate to countries with lower emission standards, it can lead to increased greenhouse gas emissions in those countries.

This might lead coal-rich countries to use less coal and more oil and gas, thus lowering their emissions. While this is of short-term benefit, it reduces the insurance provided by limiting the consumption of oil and gas. The insurance is against the possibility of delayed arrival of backstop technologies. If the arrival of alternative technologies is delayed, the replacement of coal by oil and gas might have no long-term benefit. If the alternative technology arrives earlier, then the issue of substitution becomes unimportant. In terms of climate policy, the issue of substitution means that long-term leakage needs to be considered, and not just short-term leakage.By taking into account the potential delays in alternative technologies and wider substitution effects, policymakers can develop strategies that minimize leakage and promote sustainable emissions reduction. Leakage can also be reduced if climate-concerned countries "buy coal", i.e., the right to extract fossil fuels, in other countries.

== Current schemes ==
Estimates of leakage rates for action under the Kyoto Protocol ranged from 5 to 20% as a result of a loss in price competitiveness, but these leakage rates were viewed as being very uncertain. For energy-intensive industries, the beneficial effects of Annex I actions through technological development were viewed as possibly being substantial. This beneficial effect, however, had not been reliably quantified. On the empirical evidence they assessed, Barker et al. (2007) concluded that the competitive losses of then-current mitigation actions, e.g., the EU ETS, were not significant.

The European Union hands out free EU ETS certificates (EU allowances) to sectors with high risk of carbon leakage, e.g., aluminium. It uses the Carbon Leakage Indicator (CLI) to determine sectors at risk of carbon leakage, with the formula $CLI=Trade\ Intensity \times Emission\ Intensity$.

$CLI = TI \times \bigl( Direct\ Emission\ Intensity + Indirect\ Emission\ Intensity \bigr)$$= {(Imports + Exports) \over(Turnover + Imports)} \times \Biggl( {Direct\ Emissions \over{GVA}_{DE}} +{Indirect\ Emissions\over{GVA}_{IE} } \Biggr)$,

where $GVA$ is gross value added.

Recent North American emissions schemes such as the Regional Greenhouse Gas Initiative and the Western Climate Initiative are looking at ways of measuring and equalising the price of energy 'imports' that enter their trading region

== See also ==
- Carbon Border Adjustment Mechanism
- Carbon footprint
- Carbon shifting
- Carbon tax
- Embedded emissions
- Emissions trading
- Indirect land use change impacts of biofuels
- Leakage (economics)
