= Carbon shifting =

Carbon shifting is the tendency for an individual to increase carbon dioxide emissions in one area of their lifestyle as a result of reducing emissions elsewhere. Carbon shifting might more accurately be termed "domestic carbon shifting" to distinguish it from carbon leakage, which has occasionally also been called carbon shifting.

Many attempts to encourage people to change aspects of their lifestyle and so reduce their carbon dioxide emissions make a virtue of financial savings. In the United Kingdom, the Energy Saving Trust lists various ways of saving energy, e.g., "Energy-saving light bulbs last up to twelve times longer than ordinary lightbulbs and can save you £9 per year in electricity (and 38 kilograms of CO_{2}) or £100 over the bulbs lifetime." However, whether or not carbon dioxide emissions are ultimately reduced will depend on how that saved money is spent. If the amount of money saved through walking to work is eventually spent on an extra city break involving air travel, the net emissions may well increase.

The problem of carbon shifting may undermine many voluntary piecemeal attempts at reducing carbon dioxide emissions. However, carbon shifting is not inherently negative. If a person can be persuaded to avoid activities that produce a high level of emissions for a given financial outlay, then they may shift to activities that produce lower emissions for that same amount of money. Positive carbon shifting might be encouraged through the use of a carbon tax or the implementation of a personal carbon trading scheme.

The phenomenon of carbon shifting also suggests that for some comparative purposes, the most appropriate measure of emissions would be emissions per unit of currency rather than total emissions. An activity that produces slightly lower emissions at a significantly lower cost may not necessarily be the best activity to promote as it leaves the individual with more money to spend on other emitting activities. Similarly, if two passengers are traveling on the same aircraft, they might be deemed to be emitting the same total amount of carbon dioxide. However, if one of them paid a lower fare, then by this measure, they would be deemed to be damaging the environment more.

== See also ==
- Carbon offset
- Carbon credit
- Greenwash
- Low-carbon economy
- Rebound effect (conservation)
