= Karl Zimmerer =

American geographer and environmental researcher

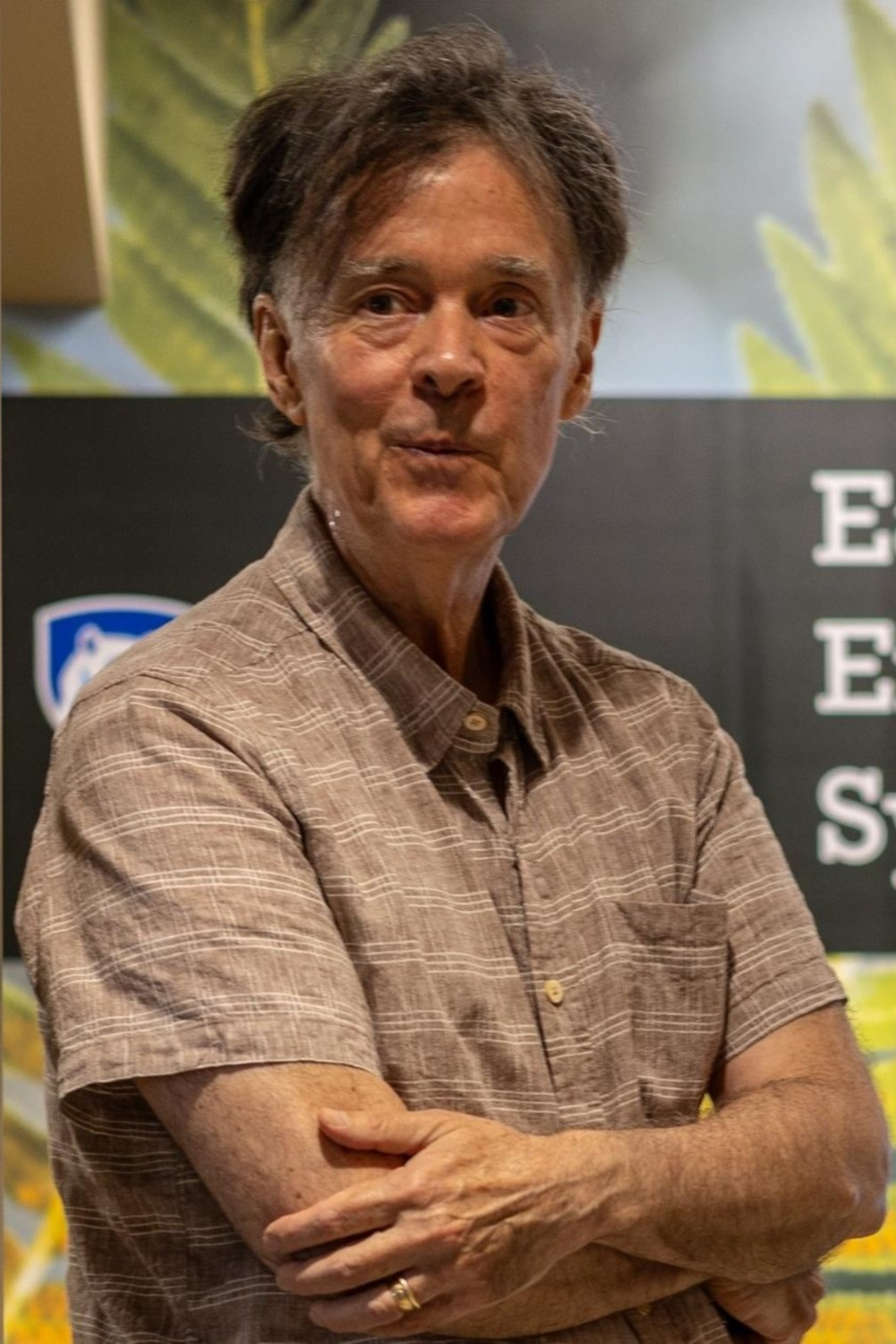
- Born: 1958 (age 67–68); New York City, U.S.
- Education: Antioch College (BSc); University of California, Berkeley (MA, PhD)
- Known for: Agrobiodiversity research, political ecology, land use and food systems
- Awards: Guggenheim Fellow (2002); Fellow of the American Association for the Advancement of Science (2012); Alexander & Ilse Melamid Medal (2013); Fellow of the American Academy of Arts and Sciences (2024)
- Scientific career
- Fields: Geography, Environmental science, Political ecology
- Workplaces: University of North Carolina at Chapel Hill; University of Wisconsin–Madison; Pennsylvania State University

Karl Zimmerer (born 1958) is an American geographer whose research focuses on the environment-society dynamics of agrobiodiversity, the biodiversity of food systems, and land use. He is currently Distinguished Professor of Environment-Society Geography at Pennsylvania State University.

== Early life and education ==
Zimmerer was born in 1958 in New York City and grew up in New Jersey, where he graduated from Ocean Township High School. His maternal grandparents emigrated from Lemkovyna in western Ukraine in the early 1900s.

He received a bachelor's degree in biology and physics from Antioch College in 1980. As an undergraduate, he held research internships at the National Center for Appropriate Technology in Montana, the Uplands Research Laboratory in the Great Smoky Mountains, and the Land Institute in Kansas. He later earned master's and doctoral degrees in geography from the University of California, Berkeley, in 1985 and 1988. His doctoral research examined food biodiversity and environment-society relationships in agricultural systems in the Peruvian Andes.

== Academic career ==
Zimmerer began his academic career in 1988 as an assistant professor at the University of North Carolina at Chapel Hill. In 1990, he joined the University of Wisconsin–Madison, where he was promoted to professor in 1996. At the University of Wisconsin–Madison he received the Romnes and Kellett faculty awards. In 2007, he became a professor at Pennsylvania State University, where he was named Distinguished Professor in 2025. He has held cross-appointments in Ecology, Rural Sociology, and Latin American and Caribbean Studies programs.

Zimmerer has been a research fellow at the Wisconsin Humanities Institute and the universities of Yale, Harvard, and Montpellier, France. His research fellowships have also included the Residency at the Bellagio Study and Conference Center in Italy.

Zimmerer founded and co-led the Environment and Development Advanced Research Circle and chaired the Departments of Geography at Wisconsin (2002–2007) and Penn State (2007–2014). He was editor of the Annals of the American Association of Geographers from 2004 to 2013. He is the founding and current Editor of the Urban Agriculture section in Frontiers in Sustainable Food Systems and directs the GeoSyntheSES Laboratory.

== Research ==
Zimmerer’s research explores the interactions between biodiversity, food systems, and land use, with a particular focus on the Andean region, including the cultivation and use of over 4,000 varieties of potatoes. His work examines how social-ecological systems are shaped by local knowledge and practices related to consumption, plant and animal care, soil and water management, seed systems, sociocultural-ecological and territorial commoning, and cultural and historical frameworks such as Buen vivir ("Living Well"). He investigates the ways in which these practices are influenced by broader factors of national and global development policies, urbanization, land-use intensification, migration, conservation efforts, and public health considerations. His research highlights both the resilience and the vulnerabilities within these socio-and political-ecological systems.

Zimmerer’s research has used extended multi-community case studies of changing food, land, water, and seed systems in global agrobiodiversity centers that began in the early 1980s with a project with Andean smallholder farmers whose knowledge and practices guide the co-evolution of the “Popping Bean,” or nuña, and other unique Andean legumes in Cajamarca, Peru. Zimmerer then lived in the Andes-Amazon ecotone of Cusco to conduct research with Indigenous Quechua farming communities who tend and eat highly agrobiodiverse Andean potatoes, Andean maize, and other food plants such as ulluco and quinoa. Their agroecological, spatial, cultural, and historical dynamics demonstrated both versatility and vulnerability. He predicted the threats and impending loss of the fast-maturing Indigenous potatoes locally known as chaucha (Solanum phureja). In the 1990s and 2000s, Zimmerer studied soil, water, social, and conservation-area influences on agrobiodiversity in periurban and rural landscapes of Cochabamba, Bolivia. This research expanded to include an ancient Indigenous irrigation system undergoing rapid development and the intensification of land use, migration, and accelerated impacts of global environmental and social changes. Since 2010 Zimmerer has researched the changing landscape and nutrition dimensions of agrobiodiversity systems influenced by specific urbanization, food system, and climate impacts in Spain and the western Mediterranean, Latin America, and selective case studies in the U.S., Africa, and Asia.

== Honors and awards ==
- Carl O. Sauer Distinguished Scholarship Award, Conference of Latin Americanist Geographers (1998)
- Henry Cowles Award, Biogeography Specialty Group, American Association of Geographers (1998)
- John Simon Guggenheim Fellow (2002)
- Fellow, American Association for the Advancement of Science (2012)
- Alexander & Ilse Melamid Medal, American Geographical Society (2013)
- Robert Netting Award, Cultural and Political Ecology Group, American Association of Geographers (2013)
- Fulbright Fellow, Peru (2015)
- Fulbright Fellow, Spain (2017–2019)
- Fellow, American Academy of Arts and Sciences (2024)
- Preston E. James Eminent Latin Americanist Career Award, CLAG (2024)

== Selected publications ==
=== Selected books ===
- Zimmerer, K. S. (1996). Changing Fortunes: Biodiversity and Peasant Livelihoods in the Peruvian Andes. University of California Press.
- Zimmerer, K. S., & Bassett, T. J., eds. (2003). Political Ecology: An Integrative Approach to Geography and Environment-Development Studies. Guilford Press.
- Zimmerer, K. S., ed. (2006). Globalization and New Geographies of Conservation. University of Chicago Press. ISBN 978-0-226-98343-1.
- Zimmerer, K. S., ed. (2013). The New Geographies of Energy: Assessment and Analysis of Critical Landscapes. Routledge.
- Fischer-Kowalski, M., Rau, H., & Zimmerer, K. S., eds. (2015). Ecological and Environmental Sciences. Vol. 9/1e. In International Encyclopedia of the Social and Behavioral Sciences, 2nd ed. Oxford: Elsevier.
- Zimmerer, K. S., & de Haan, S., eds. (2019). Agrobiodiversity: Integrating Knowledge for a Sustainable Future. Cambridge: MIT Press. ISBN 978-0262038683.

=== Selected articles ===
- Zimmerer, K. S. (1991). "The regional biogeography of native potato cultivars in highland Peru." Journal of Biogeography 18: 165–178.
- Zimmerer, K. S. (1994). "Human geography and the ‘new ecology’." Annals of the Association of American Geographers 84: 108–125.
- Zimmerer, K. S. (1995). "The origins of Andean irrigation." Nature 378: 481–483.
- Zimmerer, K. S. (1998). "The ecogeography of Andean potatoes." BioScience 48: 445–454.
- Zimmerer, K. S. (2000). "The reworking of conservation geographies." Annals of the Association of American Geographers 90: 356–370.
- Zimmerer, K. S., Galt, R. E., & Buck, M. V. (2004). "Protected-area conservation (1980–2000)." Ambio 33: 514–523.
- Zimmerer, K. S. (2010). "Biological diversity in agriculture and global change." Annual Review of Environment and Resources 35: 137–166.
- Zimmerer, K. S. (2012). "The indigenous Andean concept of kawsay." Publications of the Modern Language Association 127(3): 600–606.
- Zimmerer, K. S. (2013). "Agricultural intensification in a global hotspot of smallholder agrobiodiversity (Bolivia)." Proceedings of the National Academy of Sciences 110(8): 2769–2774.
- Zimmerer, K. S., & de Haan, S. (2017). "Agrobiodiversity and a sustainable food future." Nature Plants 3: 1–3.
- Zimmerer, K. S., De Haan, S., Jones, A. D., Creed-Kanashiro, H., Tello, M., Carrasco, M., Meza, K., Plasencia Amaya, F., Cruz García, G., Tubbeh, R., Jiménez Olivencia, Y. (2019). "The biodiversity of food and agriculture in the Anthropocene." Anthropocene 25: 1–16. doi:10.1016/j.ancene.2019.100192
- Zimmerer, K. S., Tubbeh, R. M., & Bell, M. G. (2024). "Early colonial monocropping and subaltern agrobiodiversity." The Journal of Peasant Studies 51(3): 624–650.
