= ASEAN Smart Cities Network =

The ASEAN Smart Cities Network (ASCN) is a collaborative platform that aims to unify smart city development efforts across ASEAN. The ACSN aims to facilitate cooperation on smart city development, broker smart city development projects between city government units and local private sector firms, and secure funding and support for these developments from ASEAN's external partners. The initiative was launched at the 32nd ASEAN Summit as a key deliverable of Singapore's ASEAN Chairmanship in 2018, and its Inaugural Meeting took place on 8 July 2018.

== Background ==
The ASCN was formed as a response to rapid urbanization throughout Southeast Asia, and aims to standardize the ongoing or upcoming developments of various metropolitan areas in the region.

Southeast Asia's growth has primarily been driven by metropolises, and an estimated 90 million people are expected to enter the region's metropolitan areas by 2030. "Middleweight cities" with populations between 200,000 and 2 million residents are expected to drive 40% of the region's urban development growth, and the ASCN aims to help ASEAN Member States plan and enact initiatives that wish to bring more cities up to the metropolitan level.

== ASCN Cities ==
A list of the 26 Pilot Cities that have been nominated by the respective ASEAN Member States is as follows:

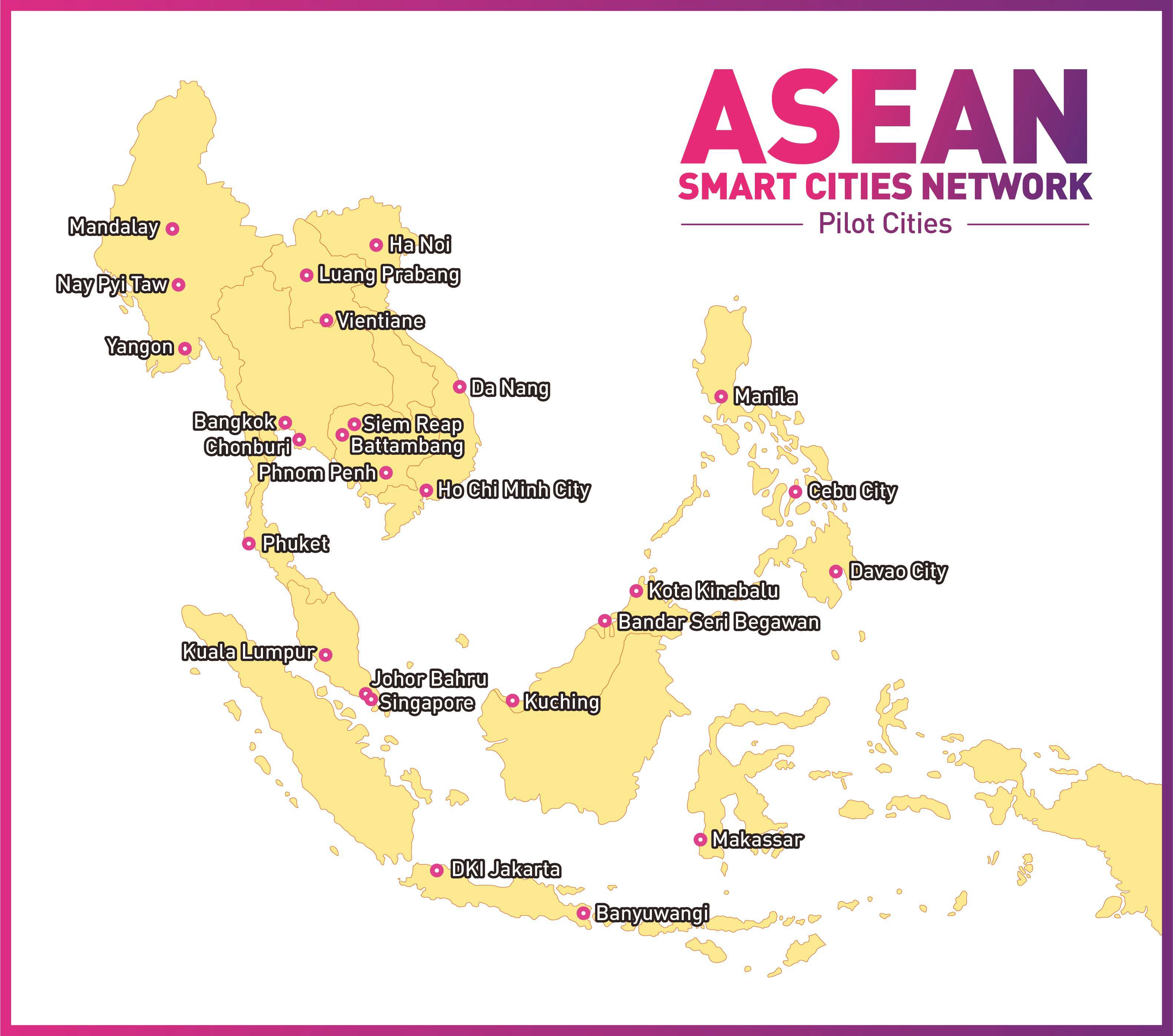
Map of the 26 Pilot Cities (clickable)

- Brunei- Bandar Seri Begawan
- Cambodia- Battambang
- Cambodia- Phnom Penh
- Cambodia- Siem Reap
- Indonesia- Makassar
- Indonesia- Banyuwangi
- Indonesia- Jakarta
- Laos- Luang Prabang
- Laos- Vientiane
- Malaysia- Johor Bahru
- Malaysia- Kuala Lumpur
- Malaysia- Kota Kinabalu
- Malaysia- Kuching
- Myanmar- Naypyidaw
- Myanmar- Mandalay
- Myanmar- Yangon
- Philippines- Cebu City
- Philippines- Davao City
- Philippines- Manila
- Singapore- Singapore
- Thailand- Bangkok
- Thailand- Chonburi
- Thailand- Phuket
- Vietnam- Da Nang
- Vietnam- Hanoi
- Vietnam- Ho Chi Minh City

The Smart City Action Plans and Priority Projects developed by the 26 Pilot Cities can be found here

== Representation ==
Each ASEAN Member State nominates a National Representative to the Network. In addition, each city also nominates a Chief Smart City Officer (CSCO). The status of a CSCO is equivalent to that of a Chief Urban Planner or Chief Resilience Officer. The CSCO's role is to attend the annual meeting, craft his or her respective city’s action plan and discuss the ASEAN Smart Cities Framework. There is thus representation at both the national and municipal levels. The table below lists the CSCOs who are each city's main point of contact with the Network.

City	Chief Smart City Officer	Designation
Bandar Seri Begawan	Haji Ali Matyassin	Chairman, Bandar Seri Begawan Municipal Department
Battambang	Soeum Bunrith	Deputy Governor, Battambang Province
Phnom Penh	NUON Pharat	Deputy Governor, Phnom Penh Capital City
Siem Reap	Ly Samreth	Deputy Governor, Siem Reap Province
Makassar	Ismail Hajiali	Head of Communications and Information, Makassar City Government
Banyuwangi	Budi Santoso	Head of Informatics, Communications and Encryption, Banyuwangi Government
DKI Jakarta	Dian Ekowati	Head of Communications and Informatics Office
Luang Prabang	Soukan Bounnyong	Mayor
Vientiane	Bouchan Keosithamma	Deputy Director of Public Works and Transport, Vientiane Capital
Johor Bahru	Maimunah Jaffar	Head, Planning and Compliance
Kuala Lumpur	Datuk Najib bin Mohamad	Executive Director (Planning)
Kota Kinabalu	Stanley Chong Hon Chung Tantinny Fung Chew Li	Director of City Planning Department, Dewan Bandaraya Kota Kinabalu Town Planner, City Planning Department, Dewan Bandaraya Kota Kinabalu
Kuching	Julin Alen	Principal Assistant Director, State Planning Unit, Chief Minister Department, Sarawak
Nay Pyi Taw	Myo Aung	Permanent Secretary, Nay Pyi Taw Development Committee
Mandalay	Ye Myat Thu	Committee Member, Mandalay City Government
Yangon	Tin Tin Kyi	Director of Urban Planning Division Representative, Yangon City Development Committee
Cebu City	Nigel Paul C. Villarete	City Administrator
Davao City	Mgen Benito Antonio T De Leon Afp Rowena Henedine Dominguez-Narajos	Head Public Safety and Security Command Center Information Technology Officer II
Manila	Mario Zapatos Oblefias	Head, Electronic Data Processing, Manila City Hall
Singapore	Tan Chee Hau	Director(Planning and Prioritization) Smart Nation and Digital Government Office, Prime Minister's Office
Bangkok	Chaiwat Thongkamkoon	Director-General, Office of Transport and Traffic Policy and Planning
Chonburi	Seksan Phunboonmee	Policy and Plan Analyst, Energy Policy and Planning Office, Ministry of Energy
Phuket	Passakon Prathombutr	Senior Executive Vice President, Digital Economy Promotion Agency
Da Nang	Nguyen Quang Thanh	Director, Da Nang Department of Information and Communication
Hanoi	Nguyen Duc Chung	Chairman, Hanoi People's Committee
Ho Chi Minh City	Tran Vinh Tuyen	Vice Chairman, Ho Chi Minh City People's Committee

== Support and partnerships ==
MOU between JETRO and UNDP

In March 2018, Australia announced a A$30 million fund to support smart city development in ASEAN.

In July 2018, five agreements were signed during the Opening Ceremony of the Inaugural ASCN Meeting. Among them was an agreement between the United Nations Development Program (UNDP) and the Japan External Trade Organization (JETRO) which expressed support for the ASCN in the context of promoting sustainable development in the Asia Pacific. An agreement was also signed between the Amata Smart City Corporation Chonburi and the Yokohama Urban Solutions Alliance.
