= International Tropical Timber Agreement =

1983 environmental treaty

The International Tropical Timber Agreement (ITTA) is an agreement to provide an effective framework for cooperation between tropical timber producers and consumers and to encourage the development of national policies aimed at sustainable utilization and conservation of tropical forests and their genetic resources. The International Tropical Timber Organization was established under this agreement, which first opened for signature on 18 November 1983, then Entered into force on 1 April 1985. There were subsequent treaties, with an increasing number of signatories, in 1994 (ITTA2) and 2006 (ITTA3).

ITTA2 (1994) was drafted to ensure that by the year 2000 exports of tropical timber originated from sustainably managed sources and to establish a fund to assist tropical timber producers in obtaining the resources necessary to reach this objective. It further defined the mandate of the International Tropical Timber Organization. The agreement was opened for signature on 26 January 1994, and entered into force on 1 January 1997.

ITTA3 (2006) aimed to "promote the expansion and diversification of international trade in tropical timber from sustainably managed and legally harvested forests and to promote the sustainable management of tropical timber producing forests". It entered into force on 7 December 2011.

== Parties ==
Thirty-two parties signed the 1983 agreement: Belgium, Brazil, Cameroon, Republic of the Congo, Ivory Coast, Denmark, Ecuador, Egypt, European Economic Community, Finland, France, Gabon, Federal Republic of Germany, Ghana, Greece, Honduras, Indonesia, Ireland, Italy, Japan, Liberia, Luxembourg, Malaysia, Netherlands, Norway, Peru, Philippines, Portugal, Union of Soviet Socialist Republics, Spain, Sweden and the United Kingdom.

Sixty-two parties ultimately ratified the 1994 agreement: Australia, Austria, Belgium, Bolivia, Brazil, Burma, Cambodia, Cameroon, Canada, Central African Republic, People's Republic of China, Colombia, Democratic Republic of the Congo, Republic of the Congo, Ivory Coast, Denmark, Ecuador, Egypt, European Union, Fiji, Finland, France, Gabon, Germany, Ghana, Greece, Guatemala, Guyana, Honduras, India, Indonesia, Ireland, Italy, Japan, South Korea, Liberia, Luxembourg, Malaysia, Mexico, Nepal, Netherlands, New Zealand, Nigeria, Norway, Panama, Papua New Guinea, Peru, Philippines, Poland, Portugal, Spain, Suriname, Sweden, Switzerland, Thailand, Togo, Trinidad and Tobago, United Kingdom, United States, Uruguay, Vanuatu, Venezuela

As of October 2018, there are 74 parties to ITTA3. Nigeria and Paraguay have signed the agreement but have not ratified it. Canada ratified the agreement in 2009, withdrew in 2013, and later rejoined in 2023.
