= Andrew Blowers (academic) =

British geographer

Andrew Blowers OBE FRSA
- Born: 1940 (age 85–86)
- Awards: Alexander & Ilse Melamid Medal (2018)

Academic background
- Education: Durham University

Academic work
- Discipline: Geography
- Sub-discipline: Environmental policy Environmental planning Radioactive waste management
- Institutions: Newcastle Polytechnic; Kingston Polytechnic; Open University

Andrew Thomas Blowers (born 1940) is a British geographer and environmentalist and Emeritus Professor of the Faculty of Arts & Social Sciences at the Open University.

== Early life and education ==
Blowers attended Colchester Royal Grammar School and won an Open Exhibition to read Geography at Durham University. He graduated in 1962 with a 2:1 degree.

== Career ==
After periods teaching at Newcastle Polytechnic and Kingston Polytechnic he joined the Open University, where he eventually became Dean of Social Sciences.

His academic work has focused on environmental protection, particularly nuclear waste management. In 1993 he campaigned against the opening of the Thermal Oxide Reprocessing Plant at Sellafield.

Alongside his academic career, Blowers served for almost 30 years as a councillor on Bedfordshire County Council, where he was at various times chair of the Environment Committee and leader of the Labour Party group. He was involved in the council's successful opposition to a proposal by Nirex to establish a low-level radioactive waste disposal facility at Elstow, near Bedford. From 1992 to 1995, he was vice-chairman of the Town and Country Planning Association.

He later became chair of the Blackwater Against New Nuclear Group (BANNG), which campaigns on nuclear development and radioactive waste issues around the Blackwater Estuary.

== Honours ==
Blowers received an OBE for services to environmental protection in the 2000 Birthday Honours. In 2004, he became a Fellow of the Royal Society of Arts and received an honorary DLitt from De Montfort University.

He was the 2018 recipient of the Alexander & Ilse Melamid Medal of the American Geographical Society.

== Selected publications ==
=== Books ===
==== Authored ====
- Blowers, Andrew (1984). Something in the Air: Corporate Power and the Environment. London: Harper & Row. ISBN 0063182793.
- ———; Lowry, David; Solomon, Barry D. (1991). The International Politics of Nuclear Waste. Basingstoke: Macmillan. ISBN 0333493648.
- ——— (2017). The Legacy of Nuclear Power. Routledge. doi:10.4324/9781315770048.

==== Edited ====
- Blowers, Andrew; Hamnett, Chris; Sarre, Philip, eds. (1974). The Future of Cities. London: Hutchinson. ISBN 0091194814.
- ———; Thompson, Grahame, eds. (1976). Inequalities, Conflict & Change. Milton Keynes: Open University Press. ISBN 0335019617.
- ———; Pepper, David, eds. (1987). Nuclear Power in Crisis: Politics and Planning for the Nuclear State. London: Croom Helm. ISBN 0709950489.
- ———, ed. (1993). Planning for a Sustainable Environment. London: Earthscan. ISBN 185383145X.

=== Journal articles ===
- Blowers, Andrew (1997). "Environmental Policy: Ecological Modernisation or the Risk Society?". Urban Studies. 34 (5–6): 845–871. doi:10.1080/0042098975853.
- ——— (2010). "Why dump on us? Power, pragmatism and the periphery in the siting of new nuclear reactors in the UK". Journal of Integrative Environmental Sciences. 7 (3): 157–173. doi:10.1080/1943815X.2010.506488.
