= International Tropical Timber Organization =

International organization

- Formation: 1986
- Purpose: Conserve & manage tropical forest resources
- Headquarters: Yokohama, Japan
- Website: www.itto.int

The International Tropical Timber Organization (ITTO) is an intergovernmental organization that promotes conservation of tropical forest resources and their sustainable management, use and trade.

== Organization ==
The organization was established under the International Tropical Timber Agreement (ITTA), which was sponsored by the United Nations Conference on Trade and Development and was ratified in 1985. Its mandate was renewed by the International Tropical Timber Agreement, 1994 and again by the International Tropical Timber Agreement, 2006, which aims to promote sustainable management and legal harvesting of forests that produce tropical timber, and to promote expansion and diversification of international timber trade from these forests.

The governing body is the International Tropical Timber Council (ITTC). Half the votes on the ITTC are assigned to producing countries and half to consumers. Within each block, votes are assigned based on market share. In January 2026, United States President Donald Trump announced that the United States would withdraw from the organization.

== Mandate and activities ==
The ITTO was at first primarily a commodity organization, regulating the international trade in tropical timber. The original mandate mentioned conservation but did not give any details. In 1990 the ITTC proposed that by 2000 all exports of tropical timber would come from sustainably managed sources, and this goal was adopted. In 1987 the ITTO commissioned the Harvard Institute for International Development to prepare a review of current knowledge of multiple-use management of tropical forests. Of interest was the potential for non-timber forest products and services that could assist in sustaining the forests. HIID completed the study in 1988 and issued updated versions in 1990 and 1992.

The ITTO publishes a quarterly newsletter, Tropical Forest Update (ISSN 1022-5439), available also online.

== See also ==
- List of forestry ministries
