= Bryant, West Virginia =

- Ghost town
- Location within West Virginia
- Coordinates: 38°01′27″N 80°44′38″W
- Country: United States
- State: West Virginia
- County: Greenbrier
- Elevation: 2,759 ft (841 m)
- GNIS feature ID

Bryant is a ghost town in Greenbrier County, West Virginia, United States. Bryant was 1 mile (1.6 km) east of Orient Hill. Bryant appeared on Soil Conservation Service maps as late as 1937.
