= Mark Hamill filmography =

Comprehensive list of Mark Hamill acting roles

Mark Hamill
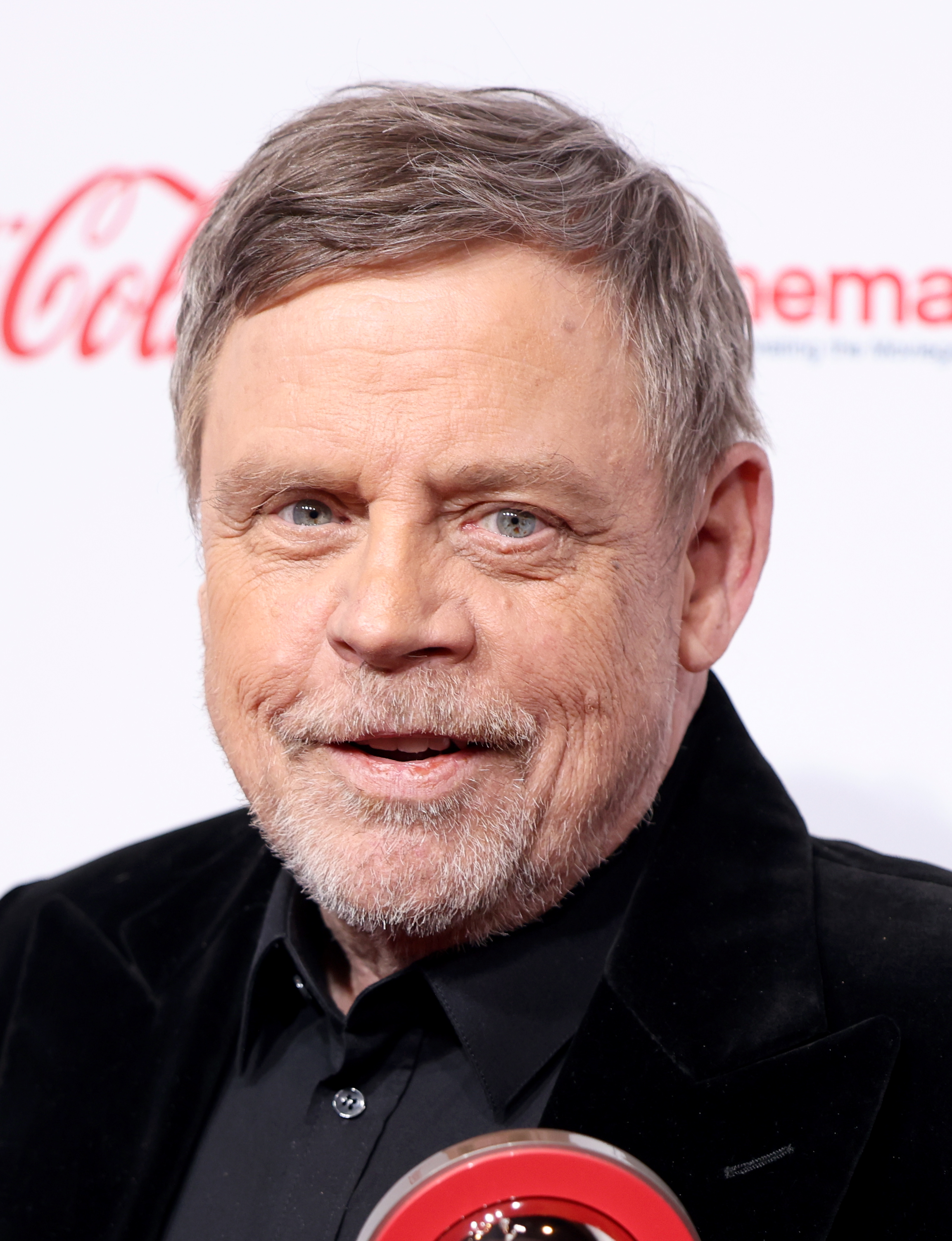
- Hamill in 2025
- Occupation: Actor
- Years active: 1970–present

Mark Hamill is an American actor with a diverse filmography spanning more than fifty years across film, television, stage, and voice acting. He gained international recognition for his portrayal of Luke Skywalker in the Star Wars franchise, beginning with the original 1977 film and reprising the role in subsequent sequels and related media over several decades. His performance in the role became a defining part of his early career and contributed significantly to the commercial and cultural success of the franchise.

Outside of Star Wars, Hamill has appeared in a variety of live-action films, including Corvette Summer (1978), The Big Red One (1980), and numerous independent and genre films. His television work includes guest appearances, recurring roles, and made-for-TV movies across a range of formats. In the 1980s, he expanded his work to the stage, appearing in Broadway and off-Broadway productions that demonstrated his range as a performer.

Hamill is also known for his extensive work as a voice actor. He has voiced characters in numerous animated television series, films, and video games, most notably the Joker in multiple Batman-related animated projects, beginning with Batman: The Animated Series in the 1990s. His voice roles span a range of genres and properties, including roles in DC Comics and Marvel adaptations, science fiction series, and video games, films, and television shows.

== Live-action roles ==
=== Films ===
Year	Title	Role	Notes	Ref(s)
1977	Star Wars	Luke Skywalker		
1978	Corvette Summer	Kenneth W. Dantley Jr.		
1980	The Empire Strikes Back	Luke Skywalker		
1980	The Big Red One	Pvt. Griff		
1981	The Night the Lights Went Out in Georgia	Conrad		
1982	Britannia Hospital	Red		
1983	Return of the Jedi	Luke Skywalker		
1989	Slipstream	Will Tasker		
1989	Fall of the Eagles	Peter Froehlich		
1990	Midnight Ride	Justin Mckay		
1991	The Guyver	Max Reed		
1991	Black Magic Woman	Brad Travis		
1992	Sleepwalkers	Sheriff Jenkins	Uncredited cameo	
1993	Time Runner	Michael Raynor	Direct-to-video	
1994	Silk Degrees	Johnson		
1994	The Raffle	Bernard Wallace		
1995	Village of the Damned	Reverend George		
1997	Laserhawk	Bob Sheridan	Direct-to-video	
1998	Hamilton	Mike Hawkins		
1998	Watchers Reborn	Detective Jack Murphy	Direct-to-video; Also co-producer	
1999	Walking Across Egypt	Lamar N. Benfield		
2001	Thank You, Good Night	Karl		
2001	Jay and Silent Bob Strike Back	Cocknocker	Cameo	
2003	Reeseville	Zeek Oakman		
2004	Comic Book: The Movie	Donald Swan	Direct-to-video; Also co-writer, director and producer	
2011	Thelomeris	The Stranger	Also creative consultant	
2012	Airborne	Malcolm		
2012	Sushi Girl	Crow		
2013	Virtually Heroes	Monk		
2013	I Know That Voice	Himself	Documentary	
2014	Kingsman: The Secret Service	Professor James Arnold		
2015	Star Wars: The Force Awakens	Luke Skywalker	Silent cameo	
2017	Brigsby Bear	Ted Mitchum		
2017	Star Wars: The Last Jedi	Luke Skywalker		
2018	Con Man	Robert Minkow		
2019	Star Wars: The Rise of Skywalker	Luke Skywalker	Cameo	
2023	The Machine	Al Kreischer		
2024	The Life of Chuck	Albie Krantz		
2025	The Long Walk	The Major		
2025	The SpongeBob Movie: Search for SquarePants	The Flying Dutchman	Also Voice	

=== Television ===
Year	Title	Role	Notes	Ref(s)
1970	Headmaster	Allen	Episode: "The Experiment"	
1970	The Bill Cosby Show	Henry	Episode: "The Poet"	
1971	The Partridge Family	Jerry	Episode: "Old Scrapmouth"	
1971	Cannon	Farm Boy	Episode: "Country Blues"	
1972	Night Gallery	Francis	Episode: "There Aren't Any More MacBanes"	
1972	The F.B.I.	Royal Shean	Episode: "The Corruptor"	
1972–1973	General Hospital	Kent Murray		
1972–1973	Owen Marshall: Counselor at Law	Pete Hamilton / Steven Knight	2 episodes	
1973	The Magician	Ian Keefer	Episode: "Lightning on a Dry Day"	
1973	Room 222	Matt	3 episodes	
1974	Insight	Steve	Episode: "When You See Arcturus"	
1974	The Manhunter	Mark	Episode: "The Lodester Ambush"	
1974–1975	The Texas Wheelers	Doobie Wheeler	8 episodes	
1975	Bronk	Kevin Bossick	Episode: "Line of Fire"	
1975	Eric	Paul Swensen	Television film	
1975	Petrocelli	David Mitchell / Dennis Wylie	2 episodes	
1975	Sarah T. – Portrait of a Teenage Alcoholic	Ken Newkirk	Television film	
1975	Delancey Street: The Crisis Within	Philip Donaldson	Television film	
1975–1977	The Streets of San Francisco	Andy Turner / Billy Wilson	2 episodes	
1976	Medical Center	Danny	Episode: "You Can't Annul My Baby"	
1976	Mallory: Circumstantial Evidence	Joe Celi	Television film	
1976	One Day at a Time	Harvey Schneider	Episode: "Schneider's Pride and Joy"	
1977	The City	Eugene Banks	Television film	
1977	Eight Is Enough	David Bradford	Episode: "Never Try Eating Nectarines Since Juice May Dispense"	
1978	Star Wars Holiday Special	Luke Skywalker	Television special	
1980	The Muppet Show	Himself / Luke Skywalker	Guest	
1986	Amazing Stories	Jonathan	Episode: "Gather Ye Acorns"	
1987	Alfred Hitchcock Presents	Danny Carlyle	Episode: "Man on the Edge"	
1989	Hooperman	Producer	Episode: "Intolerance"	
1991	Earth Angel	Wayne Stein	Television film	
1991	The Flash	James Jesse / Trickster	2 episodes	
1993	Body Bags	Brent Matthews	Television film; Segment: "Eye"	
1993	Une image de trop	Josh Payton	Television film	
1994	Burke's Law	Simon the Sorcerer	Episode: "Who Killed Alexander the Great?"	
1995	seaQuest DSV	Tobias LeConte	2 episodes	
1996	The Outer Limits	Dr. Sam Stein	Episode: "Mind Over Matter"	
1996	Space Cases	Ferna Herna	Episode: "A Day in the Life"	
1997	3rd Rock from the Sun	Himself	Episode: "Fifteen Minutes of Dick"	
1997	When Time Expires	Bill Thermot	Television film	
1997	Saturday Night Live	Himself	Episode: "Sting/Veruca Salt"	
1998	Just Shoot Me!	Himself	Episode: "The List"	
2000–2002	Son of the Beach	The Divine Rod	3 episodes	
2001	V.I.P.	Ned Irons	Episode: "The Uncle from V.A.L."	
2011	Chuck	Jean-Claude	Episode: "Chuck Versus the Zoom"	
2013	The Neighbors	Commandant Bill	Episode: "It Has Begun..."	
2013	Criminal Minds	John Curtis / The Replicator	2 episodes	
2015	Star Wars: Evolution of the Lightsaber Duel	Himself (host)	Television documentary	
2015–2016	The Flash	James Jesse / Trickster	3 episodes	
2016	Man Down	Bob	Episode: "The Party"	
2016–2017	Pop Culture Quest	Himself (host)	10 episodes; also producer	
2017	Mystery Science Theater 3000	P.T. Mindslap	Episode: "Carnival Magic"	
2017	Nightcap	Himself	Episode: "The Show Must Go On"	
2018	The Big Bang Theory	Himself	Episode: "The Bow Tie Asymmetry"	
2019	Knightfall	Talus	5 episodes	
2020	What We Do in the Shadows	Jim the Vampire	Episode: "On the Run"	
2020	Royalties	Philip Combs	Episode: "Mighty as Kong"	
2020	The Mandalorian	Luke Skywalker (likeness and voice recreated digitally)	Episode: "Chapter 16: The Rescue"	
2022	The Book of Boba Fett	Luke Skywalker (likeness and voice recreated digitally)	Episode: "Chapter 6: From the Desert Comes a Stranger"	
2022	The Kids in the Hall	Sasha	Episode #6.8	
2023	The Fall of the House of Usher	Arthur Pym	8 episodes	
2026	Carrie	Damon Nostra	Episode: "Home Economics"	
TBA	Twisted Metal †	Pope Charlie Kane	Recurring role (season 3)	

Key
†	Denotes works that have not yet been released

=== Music videos ===
Year	Title	Artist	Album	Role	Ref(s)
2021	"My Sweet Lord"	George Harrison	All Things Must Pass	Himself	

=== Video games ===
Year	Title	Role
1994	Wing Commander III: Heart of the Tiger	Colonel Christopher Blair
1996	Wing Commander IV: The Price of Freedom	Colonel Christopher Blair
1997	Wing Commander: Prophecy	Commodore Christopher Blair
2027	Squadron 42 †	Lieutenant Commander Steve Colton

Key
†	Denotes works that have not yet been released

== Voice roles ==
=== Films ===
Year	Title	Role	Notes	Ref(s)
1977	Wizards	Sean		
1993	Batman: Mask of the Phantasm	The Joker		
1998	Scooby-Doo on Zombie Island	Snakebite Scruggs, Airport Manager	Direct-to-video	
1998	Wing Commander	Merlin		
1998	Gen^{13}	Threshold	Direct-to-video	
2000	Sinbad: Beyond the Veil of Mists	Captain of the Guard		
2000	Scooby-Doo and the Alien Invaders	Steve	Direct-to-video	
2000	Joseph: King of Dreams	Judah	Direct-to-video	
2000	Batman Beyond: Return of the Joker	The Joker	Direct-to-video	
2001	Earth Day	Dr. Bob	Short film	
2001	Jay and Silent Bob Strike Back	Scooby-Doo		
2002	Balto II: Wolf Quest	Niju	Direct-to-video	
2002	Baxter and Bananas	Bananas	Short film	
2003	Aero-Troopers: The Nemeclous Crusade	Older Joshua	Direct-to-video	
2003	Burl's	Narrator	Short film	
2003	Castle in the Sky	Colonel Muska	English dub	
2004	Wolf Tracer's Dinosaur Island	Blake	Short film	
2005	Batman: New Times	The Joker	Short film	
2005	Nausicaä of the Valley of the Wind	Mayor of Pejite	English dub	
2005	Thru the Moebius Strip	Simon Weir		
2006	Queer Duck: The Movie	Vendor	Direct-to-video	
2006	Ultimate Avengers 2	Dr. Willard Oiler	Direct-to-video	
2006	Choose Your Own Adventure: The Abominable Snowman	Jamling	Direct-to-video	
2006	Robotech: The Shadow Chronicles	Commander Darryl Taylor	Direct-to-video	
2006	Tom and Jerry: Shiver Me Whiskers	The Skull	Direct-to-video	
2007	Battle for Terra	Elder Orin		
2007	Futurama: Bender's Big Score	Chanukah Zombie	Direct-to-video	
2008	Quantum Quest: A Cassini Space Odyssey	Void		
2009	Tigger and Pooh and a Musical Too	Turtle	Direct-to-video	
2009	Mythic Journeys	The Corpse	Documentary	
2010	Dante's Inferno: An Animated Epic	Alighiero	Direct-to-video	
2010	Scooby-Doo! Camp Scare	Deacon, Babyface Boretti, Store Owner	Direct-to-video	
2012	Back to the Sea	Bunker		
2013	Finnigan's War	Narrator	Documentary	
2015	Scooby-Doo! Moon Monster Madness	Zip Elvin	Direct-to-video	
2015	Lego DC Comics Super Heroes: Justice League: Attack of the Legion of Doom	The Trickster, Sinestro	Direct-to-video	
2015	Regular Show: The Movie	Skips		
2016	Batman: The Killing Joke	The Joker / Red Hood		
2017	Bunyan and Babe	Grandpa		
2017	Howard Lovecraft & the Undersea Kingdom	Dr. Henry Armitage	Direct-to-video	
2017	Best Fiends: Boot Camp	Temper	Short film	
2017	Best Fiends: Visit Minutia	Temper	Short film	
2017	Star Wars: The Last Jedi	Dobbu Scay		
2018	Best Fiends: Fort of Hard Knocks	Temper	Short film	
2018	Legend of Hallowaiian	Officer Duke	Direct-to-video	
2018	Howard Lovecraft and the Kingdom of Madness	Dr. Henry Armitage	Direct-to-video	
2019	Best Fiends: Howie's Gift	Temper	Short film	
2019	Child's Play	Chucky		
2019	Star Wars: The Rise of Skywalker	Boolio	credited as Patrick Williams	
2023	Metalocalypse: Army of the Doomstar	Mr. Salacia, Senator Stampingston	Direct-to-video	
2023	The Boy and the Heron	Granduncle	English dub	
2024	Justice League: Crisis on Infinite Earths	The Joker (Earth-12)	Direct-to-video	
2024	The Wild Robot	Thorn		
2025	The King of Kings	King Herod		

=== Television ===
Year	Title	Role	Notes
1973	Jeannie	Corey Anders	16 episodes
1973–1974	The New Scooby-Doo Movies	Announcer, Corey Anders, Windmaker No. 2	3 episodes
1992	The Legend of Prince Valiant	King Weldon	Episode: "Peace on Earth"
1992–1994	Batman: The Animated Series	Joker, Ferris Boyle, additional voices	15 episodes
1993	The Little Mermaid	Zeus, Hans Christian Andersen	2 episodes
1993	Hollyrock-a-Bye Baby	Slick	Television film
1993	Wild West C.O.W.-Boys of Moo Mesa	Scavenger	Episode: "Circus Daze"
1993	Biker Mice from Mars	L'Ectromag	Episode: "The Reeking Reign of the Head Cheese"
1993–1994	SWAT Kats: The Radical Squadron	Johnny K., Burke, Red Lynx, additional voices	8 episodes
1993–1994	ABC Weekend Specials	The Admiral, Prince Tamino	2 episodes
1994	Bonkers	Crookshank	Episode: "A Fine Kettle of Toons"
1994	Garfield and Friends	Mesmer, Curdman	Episode: "Clash of the Titans"
1994	Red Planet	James Marlowe Sr.	2 episodes
1994–1995	Phantom 2040	Dr. Jak	20 episodes
1994–1995	Fantastic Four	Maximus, Triton, Sentry 213	2 episodes
1995	Freakazoid!	Himself	Episode: "And Fanboy Is His Name"
1995	The Ren & Stimpy Show	Mr. Noggin	Episode: "Bell Hops"
1995	Mina and the Count	The Count	6 episodes
1995–1998	Spider-Man: The Animated Series	Jason Philips / Hobgoblin	8 episodes
1996	Adventures from the Book of Virtues	Theseus	Episode: "Courage"
1996	Wing Commander Academy	Christopher 'Maverick' Blair	13 episodes
1996	The Tick	Julius Pendecker	Episode: "Devil in Diapers"
1996	The Spooktacular New Adventures of Casper	Ghost of Christmas Present, Ezra Hazzard	2 episodes
1996	Hey Arnold!	Homeless Man, Police Officer	Episode: "Das Subway"
1996–1997	The Real Adventures of Jonny Quest	General Vostok, Eldoradoan	3 episodes
1996–1997	Bruno the Kid	Harris	36 episodes
1996–1997	The Incredible Hulk	Gargoyle	11 episodes
1997–2004	Johnny Bravo	Additional voices	6 episodes
1997	Pinky and the Brain	Jimmy Joe Jr.	Episode: "Brain Acres"
1997	Superman: The Animated Series	The Joker	Episode: "World's Finest"
1997–1999	The New Batman Adventures	The Joker	6 episodes
1998	Ancient Voices	Narrator	11 episodes
1998	Cow and Chicken	Vet, Hole Mayor	Episode: "The Karate Chick"
1998	I Am Weasel	Yellow-Haired Guest	Episode: "The Hole"
1998	The Simpsons	Himself, Leavelle	Episode: "Mayored to the Mob"
1998–2000	Pepper Ann	Himself, additional voices	4 episodes
1999	The Powerpuff Girls	Criminal, Cop No. 1, White Kitty	2 episodes
1999	The Night of the Headless Horseman	Van Ripper	Television film
1999–2002	The New Woody Woodpecker Show	Buzz Buzzard, Tweakey da Lackey, Badger	53 episodes
2000	Batman Beyond	Carter	Episode: "Out of the Past"
2000	Buzz Lightyear of Star Command	Flint	Episode: "Planet of the Lost"
2001	The Oblongs	Mr. Phugly	Episode: "Milo Interrupted"
2001	The Cartoon Cartoon Show	Ferret	Episode: "Ferret & Parrot"
2001	Samurai Jack	Guinness	Episode: "Jack Under the Sea"
2001–2003	Time Squad	Larry 3000, additional voices	26 episodes
2002	Static Shock	The Joker	Episode: "The Big Leagues"
2002	Rocket Power	Ralph Sr.	Episode: "What a Tangled Web We Ski"
2002	Totally Spies!	Principal John Smith	Episode: "Soul Collector"
2002	Dexter's Laboratory	Magic Uncle Fergel O'Reilly	Episode: "That Magic Moment"
2002	Birds of Prey	The Joker	Episode: "Pilot"
2002	Rapsittie Street Kids: Believe in Santa	Eric	Television film
2002–2003	Justice League	The Joker, Solomon Grundy	9 episodes
2002–2003	Grim & Evil	Additional voices	2 episodes
2002–2003	What's New, Scooby-Doo?	Tommy's Father, Barge Captain	2 episodes
2002–2003	Teamo Supremo	The Birthday Bandit	3 episodes
2002–2008	Codename: Kids Next Door	Captain Stickybeard	9 episodes
2003	Stuart Little	Tiger	Episode: "No Job is Too Little"
2003	Clifford the Big Red Dog	Oscar Owens	Episode: "Guess Who's Coming to Birdwell"
2003	Stripperella	Dr. Cesarian, Narisec Rotcod, additional voices	2 episodes
2003	Nature	Narrator	Episode: "Hippo Beach"
2003	Family Guy	Luke Skywalker, Obi-Wan Kenobi	Episode: "When You Wish Upon a Weinstein"
2003–2005	The Wrong Coast	Jameson Burkwright	26 episodes
2004–2006	Super Robot Monkey Team Hyperforce Go!	Skeleton King, Alchemist, additional voices	20 episodes
2005	Harvey Birdman, Attorney at Law	Ricochet Rabbit	Episode: "X Gets the Crest"
2005	IGPX: Immortal Grand Prix	Yamma	Episode: "Time to Shine"
2005–2006	Danger Rangers	Burt	16 episodes
2005–2008	Avatar: The Last Airbender	Fire Lord Ozai, additional voices	11 episodes
2005–2012, 2019	Robot Chicken	Various characters	9 episodes
2006	Justice League Unlimited	James Jesse / Trickster	Episode: "Flash and Substance"
2006	Biker Mice from Mars	Pierre Fluffbottom, Hardaxe	Episode: "Rumpity-Dumpster"
2006	The Batman	Tony Zucco	Episode: "A Matter of Family"
2006	Loonatics Unleashed	Captain, Adolpho	Episode: "A Creep in the Deep"
2006	Operation: Z.E.R.O	Captain Stickybeard	Television film
2006	Danny Phantom	Undergrowth	Episode: "Urban Jungle"
2006–2013	Metalocalypse	Senator Stampingston, Mr. Selatcia, Chef Jean-Pierre, additional voices	56 episodes
2007	SpongeBob SquarePants	Moth	Episode: "Night Light"
2007	Green Arrow: The Legend of the Emerald Archer	Narrator	Short Documentary
2007	Robot Chicken: Star Wars	Luke Skywalker	Television special
2007–2008	My Friends Tigger & Pooh	Turtle	4 episodes
2008	Rick & Steve: The Happiest Gay Couple in All the World	Saul	Episode: "Gravity and the Great Attractor"
2008–2009	Tasty Time with ZeFronk	Dom	20 episodes
2009	Afro Samurai: Resurrection	Bin, Oden Shop Master	English dub; television film
2010	Batman: The Brave and the Bold	The Spectre	3 episodes
2010	The Boondocks	Grant	Episode: "Mr. Medicinal"
2010	The Avengers: Earth's Mightiest Heroes	Klaw	2 episodes
2010, 2014	Adventure Time	Evil Guy, Fear Feaster, additional voices	4 episodes
2010–2011	Zevo-3	Stankfoot, additional voices	26 episodes
2010–2011	The Super Hero Squad Show	Red Skull, Chthon	3 episodes
2010–2011	Generator Rex	Quarry, additional voices	3 episodes
2010–2012	Hero Factory	Von Nebula, Von Ness, Black Phantom	4 episodes
2010–2017	Regular Show	Skips, additional voices	163 episodes
2011	Dan Vs.	Dr. Pullum, Mall Santa	2 episodes
2011	The Problem Solverz	Buddy Huxton, Bad Cat	2 episodes
2011	The Cleveland Show	Security Officer	Episode: "Hot Cocoa Bang Bang"
2011	NTSF:SD:SUV::	Lundgren the Evil Dolphin	Episode: "Dolphinnegan's Wake"
2012	Scooby-Doo! Mystery Incorporated	Crybaby Clown	2 episodes
2012–2013	Motorcity	Abraham Kane	12 episodes
2012–2014, 2017	DreamWorks Dragons	Alvin the Treacherous	14 episodes
2012–2016	Ultimate Spider-Man	Nightmare, Arnim Zola, Shou-Lao, Ox	11 episodes
2013	Brickleberry	Bosco	Episode: "Crippleberry"
2013	Metalocalypse: The Doomstar Requiem	Mr. Salacia, Senator Stampingston	Television special
2013	The Garfield Show	Master Control, additional voices	3 episodes
2013–2014	Turbo Fast	Breakneck, Warlarva	4 episodes
2014	Gravity Falls	Mysterious Old Man	Episode: "Into the Bunker"
2014	Star Wars: The Clone Wars	Darth Bane	Episode: "Sacrifice"
2014	Ben 10: Omniverse	Maltruant, Red Coat	4 episodes
2014	Elf: Buddy's Musical Christmas	Walter Hobbs	Television special
2014	The Tom and Jerry Show	Santa	Episode: "Santa's Little Helpers"
2014–2016	Transformers: Rescue Bots	Woodrow Burns, additional voices	8 episodes
2014–2016	Jake and the Never Land Pirates	ShiverJack, additional voices	4 episodes
2015	Be Cool, Scooby-Doo!	General Stall	Episode: "Area 51 Adjacent"
2015–2018	Miles from Tomorrowland	Gadfly Garnett, additional voices	11 episodes
2016	Uncle Grandpa	Joss Bossman	Episode: "The Return of Aunt Grandma"
2016–2024	Kulipari: An Army of Frogs	Old Jir, additional voices	26 episodes
2016–2018	Justice League Action	Swamp Thing, The Joker, Trickster, Himself	8 episodes
2017	Teenage Mutant Ninja Turtles	Kavaxas	4 episodes
2017	Dimension 404	Narrator	6 episodes
2017	Penn Zero: Part-Time Hero	Adam Tom-Kat Badawy	Episode: "At the End of the Worlds"
2017–2018	Trollhunters: Tales of Arcadia	Dictatious	11 episodes
2017–2019	Milo Murphy's Law	Mr. Block, additional voices	15 episodes
2017–2019	Avengers Assemble	Arnim Zola	5 episodes
2018	Transformers: Titans Return	Megatronus	Episode: "All Things Must Pass"
2018	Spider-Man	Arnim Zola, Cop #1	Episode: "Spider-Island"
2018	Star Wars Forces of Destiny	Luke Skywalker	2 episodes
2018	Transformers: Power of the Primes	Megatronus	7 episodes
2018	The Venture Bros.	Presto-Chango, Illuminati #1	Episode: "The Unicorn in Captivity"
2018–2019	The Stinky & Dirty Show	Spacey	3 episodes
2019	The Adventures of Rocky and Bullwinkle	Himself, Captain Great Guy	2 episodes
2019	Weird City	Xander	Episode: "Smart House"
2019	Lucky	Houlihan	Television film
2019	American Dad!	Barkeeper	Episode: "Wild Women Do"
2019	The Mandalorian	EV-9D9	Uncredited; Episode: "Chapter 5: The Gunslinger"
2019	The Dark Crystal: Age of Resistance	The Scientist (skekTek)	9 episodes
2019–2020	New Looney Tunes	Hans Hamster, Mr. Big	2 episodes
2019–2020	Scooby-Doo and Guess Who?	The Joker, Trickster, Himself	3 episodes
2020	Wizards: Tales of Arcadia	Dictatious	4 episodes
2020	Elena of Avalor	Vuli	Episode: "Coronation Day"
2020–2021	The Last Kids on Earth	Bardle	12 episodes
2021–2024	Masters of the Universe: Revelation	Skeletor	14 episodes
2021	Creepshow	Mayor Wrightson	Episode: "The Things in Oakwood's Past"
2021–present	Invincible	Art Rosenbaum	9 episodes
2022–2025	The Sandman	Mervyn Pumpkinhead	7 episodes
2023	Futurama	Chanukah Zombie	Episode: "I Know What You Did Next Xmas"
2024	How NOT to Draw	Animator	Episode: "R2-D2"
2024	Lego Star Wars: Rebuild the Galaxy	Luke Skywalker	Miniseries
2025	Digman!	Jasper Jenkins	Episode: "A Sari Sight"
2026–present	Regular Show: The Lost Tapes	Skips	
TBA	Darkwing Duck	Drake Mallard	Main role

Key
†	Denotes works that have not yet been released

=== Video games ===
Year	Title	Role	Notes	Ref(s)
1993	Gabriel Knight: Sins of the Fathers	Detective Mosely, Jeep Driver		
1994	Bouncers	Ugh, Chip, Dash, Old Man	Mega-CD version only	
1994	The Adventures of Batman & Robin	The Joker	Mega-CD version only	
1994	Wing Commander III: Heart of the Tiger	Colonel Christopher Blair		
1995	Full Throttle	Adrian Ripburger, Emmet, Todd Newlan		
1996	Wing Commander IV: The Price of Freedom	Colonel Christopher Blair		
1997	Wing Commander: Prophecy	Colonel Christopher Blair		
1999	Starsiege	Harabec		
2001	Crash Bandicoot: The Wrath of Cortex	Py-Ro		
2001	Batman: Vengeance	The Joker		
2002	Soldier of Fortune II: Double Helix	Assistant Director Wilson		
2002	The Scorpion King: Rise of the Akkadian	Apep, Wounded Akkadian, Soldier No. 1		
2002	Grandia Xtreme	Col. Kroitz	English dub	
2003	X2: Wolverine's Revenge	Wolverine, Omega Red		
2005	Codename: Kids Next Door – Operation: V.I.D.E.O.G.A.M.E.	Stickybeard		
2005	Call of Duty 2: Big Red One	Narrator		
2006	Yakuza	Goro Majima	English dub	
2008	The Legend of Spyro: Dawn of the Dragon	Malefor		
2008	Crash: Mind over Mutant	Znu		
2008	Avatar: The Last Airbender – Into the Inferno	Fire Lord Ozai		
2009	Fusionfall	Stickybeard		
2009	Batman: Arkham Asylum	The Joker		
2010	Darksiders	The Watcher		
2010	Kingdom Hearts Birth by Sleep	Eraqus	English dub	
2011	Marvel Super Hero Squad: The Infinity Gauntlet	Red Skull		
2011	DC Universe Online	The Joker		
2011	Batman: Arkham City	The Joker		
2011	Batman: Arkham City Lockdown	The Joker		
2015	Batman: Arkham Knight	The Joker		
2016	Lego Marvel's Avengers	Arnim Zola		
2016	Master of Orion: Conquer the Stars	Alkari Emperor		
2016	Batman: Arkham VR	The Joker		
2016	Let It Die	Narrator		
2016	Lego Dimensions	Evil Guy		
2018	Lego DC Super-Villains	The Joker, The Trickster		
2019	Kingdom Hearts III	Eraqus	English dub	
2024	MultiVersus	The Joker		

=== Applications ===
Year	Title	Role	Notes	Ref(s)
2022	Air Alert	English voice	An application for Ukraine's air raid alerts, specifically the one developed by Ajax Systems.	

== Stage ==
Year	Title	Role	Venue
1981	The Elephant Man	John Merrick	Booth Theatre
1982–1983	Amadeus	Wolfgang Amadeus Mozart	National tour Broadhurst Theatre
1985	Harrigan 'N Hart	Tony Hart	Longacre Theatre
1986	Room Service	Gordon Miller	Union Square Theatre
1987	The Nerd	Willum Cubbert	Helen Hayes Theatre
2003	Six Dance Lessons in Six Weeks	Michael Minetti	Coconut Grove Playhouse; Belasco Theatre

== Audiobooks ==
Year	Title	Notes
1983	The Adventures of Pinocchio	
2003–2009	The Spiderwick Chronicles	
2006	World War Z	Played Todd Wainio

== See also ==
- Mark Hamill awards and nominations
