= Bellburn, West Virginia =

Unincorporated community in West Virginia, United States

- Unincorporated community
- Location within West Virginia Location within the United States
- Coordinates: 38°02′30″N 80°43′59″W
- Country: United States
- State: West Virginia
- County: Greenbrier
- Elevation: 2,858 ft (871 m)
- Time zone: UTC-5 (Eastern (EST))
  - Summer (DST): UTC-4 (EDT)
- Area codes: 304 & 681
- GNIS feature ID: 1553845

Bellburn is an unincorporated community and coal town in Greenbrier County, West Virginia, United States. Bellburn is 2 miles (3.2 km) southwest of Quinwood.
