= Walker Hill, West Virginia =

- Ghost town
- Location within West Virginia
- Coordinates: 38°01′48″N 80°43′34″W
- Country: United States
- State: West Virginia
- County: Greenbrier
- Elevation: 3,005 ft (916 m)
- GNIS feature ID

Walker Hill is a ghost town in Greenbrier County, West Virginia, United States. Walker Hill was located immediately north of Orient Hill. Walker Hill appeared on USGS maps as late as 1935.
