= Imperial Smokeless Coal Company =

Defunct mining company, West Virginia

Coordinates: 38°03′27″N 80°42′25″W

- Founded: 5 June 1919
- Founder: Quin Martin; Walter Seal Wood
- Fate: Acquired by Vera Pocahontas Coal Company
- Headquarters: Quinwood, West Virginia

The Imperial Smokeless Coal Company was a coal-mining company founded in Quinwood, West Virginia in the United States on June 5, 1919.

== History ==
The company operated three mines in northwestern Greenbrier County, West Virginia and Eastern Nicholas County, West Virginia until it was sold to Vera Pocahontas Coal Company in 1940, which was later acquired by Westmoreland Coal. The company's founders, Quin Martin and Walter Seal Wood, are the namesakes of the town, which was built around the mine. All three mines previously operated by Imperial Smokeless were closed by Westmoreland in the 1970s, and little record of the company exists, although Imperial Smokeless company scrip is a common collector's item.
