= Children's Hunger Fund =

US-based non-profit organization

- Founded: 1991; 35 years ago
- Founder: Dave Phillips
- Type: Nonprofit/Faith-Based
- Purpose: Compassion ministry
- Location(s): Los Angeles, 13931 Balboa Blvd., Sylmar, CA 91342 (headquarters and (distribution center); San Antonio (distribution center); Dallas (distribution center)
- Region served: Domestic and International
- Method: In-home food delivery
- Website: ChildrensHungerFund.org

Children's Hunger Fund (CHF) is a Christian non-profit organization that resources and empowers local churches in the United States and around the world to meet the needs of their impoverished community members. CHF's mission is to "deliver hope to suffering children by equipping local churches for gospel-centered mercy ministry".

== About ==
CHF's ministry approach to families and support of local churches is summed up in the acronym F.A.C.E.: Feed, Aid, Connect, and Equip. By providing food and aid to domestic and international churches, CHF connects them to families in their community. CHF equips these churches through training and education.

CHF developed the Food Pak program as a method of delivering food into the homes of families in need. Food Paks, which can hold up to 20 pounds of non-perishable food and feed a family of four for up to a week, are packaged and prepared by volunteers in CHF distribution centers. Food Paks are later picked up by local churches, or shipped to international churches via sea containers. When the churches receive these boxes of food, they deliver them to families in their community. CHF calls this method of distribution Relational Mercy Ministry.

As of 2013, CHF had distributed more than $1 billion in aid to children and families in need.

== History ==
Dave Phillips, founder and president, began the ministry in 1991, working out of his garage with only one employee. They served eight churches composed of 200–300 families.

In response to the 1992 Los Angeles riots, CHF increased its food distribution program in South Central Los Angeles. When the 1994 Northridge earthquake struck the San Fernando Valley, the Federal Emergency Management Agency (FEMA) asked Children's Hunger Fund to participate in relief efforts.

CHF launched the Care Package program in 1998. For the first time, food was packed into cardboard boxes designed to assist a family in need. CHF’s desire was to encourage a more relational approach to helping the poor. Volunteers were trained to take the food to struggling families, visiting them in their own home, and establishing an ongoing, caring relationship through repeated home deliveries. What was then known as a Care Package is now called a "Food Pak", CHF's relationship-building tool, used to minister to children and families.

In 2004, CHF began a partnership with Africa Renewal Ministries in Uganda, to form the first Mercy Network. A Mercy Network is a collection of like-minded churches that are pursuing gospel-centered Relational Mercy Ministry. CHF began resourcing churches in Uganda with Food Paks, and financial support to build homes for Bethany Village orphanage.

Two years later, CHF expanded its reach by opening its second distribution center, located just outside of Chicago, Illinois. In its first year, the Midwest region trained 64 churches and agencies for Relational Mercy Ministry in their communities. However, this office was closed in July 2018.

CHF's Southwest region was started in 2009 with the addition of a San Antonio distribution center, and expanded in 2016 by opening a Dallas distribution center.

In 2013, CHF launched Rethink Mercy Equipping (RME)—these workshops train churches to reach out to their communities through Relational Mercy Ministry. Once trained, churches receive resources, such as Food Paks, and join like-minded churches in Mercy Networks, with a goal to impact their communities with the gospel. To date, more than 1,100 churches have been trained by CHF through RME, resulting in a total of 46 Mercy Networks across five continents.

== Efficiency rating ==
CHF is a member of the Evangelical Council for Financial Accountability and receives a 5 out of 5 Star Financial Efficiency Rating from Ministry Watch. CHF has repeatedly received a 4-star rating through Charity Navigator, their highest valuation possible.

== Mercy Networks ==
A Mercy Network is a collection of like-minded churches that are pursuing gospel-centered, relational mercy ministry. CHF's international Mercy Networks are formed with the help of a central NGO which acts as the hub for churches in the area.

Children's Hunger Fund Mercy Networks exist in 24 countries as of 2016:

1. United States
2. Mexico
3. Guatemala
4. El Salvador
5. Honduras
6. Haiti
7. Dominican Republic
8. Ecuador
9. Peru
10. Ghana
11. Uganda
12. Rwanda
13. South Africa
14. Kenya
15. Ethiopia
16. Zambia
17. Zimbabwe
18. Myanmar
19. Thailand
20. Nepal
21. Philippines
22. Belarus
23. Romania
24. Ukraine

== Volunteering ==
CHF accepts volunteers from churches, community groups, and schools into distribution centers in Los Angeles, Chicago, San Antonio, and Dallas. Volunteers pack Food Paks on an assembly line, as well as bag bulk food, wrap toys, and sort donated product. CHF has an average of over 24,000 volunteer visits annually.

America's Toy Wrap is CHF's largest annual volunteer event. Each year, thousands of volunteers gather to wrap toys donated by corporate manufacturers or retailers, which are later distributed to children through local churches and organizations.

== CHF Children's Champion Award ==
The Children’s Champion Award exists to recognize those who have used their positions of influence in government, business, public life, and charity to ensure that children—children they may never meet—receive hope against the odds.

2011

- Bobby Bowden, Florida State University coach
- S. Truett Cathy, founder of Chick-fil-A

2010

- David Robinson, NBA champion
- Michael Hart, and Carol Hart, co-founders of Zoe Children's Homes

2009

- Steven Curtis Chapman, and Mary Beth Chapman, co-founders of Show Hope
- Jim Daly, President and CEO of Focus on the Family

2006

- Ty Warner, CEO and President of Ty Inc., manufacturer of the Beanie Baby product line
- Myron Wentz, Founder of USANA Health Sciences

== Notable affiliated persons ==
- Francis Chan – Pastor and best-selling author of Crazy Love
- Kirk Cameron – Actor and co-founder of The Firefly Foundation
- Myron Wentz – Founder of USANA Health Sciences
- Ty Warner – CEO and founder of Ty Inc.
