= USANA Health Sciences =

American multi-level marketing company

Coordinates: 40.711563°N 111.980288°W

USANA Health Sciences, Inc.
- Type: Public
- Traded as: NYSE: USNA; Russell 2000 component
- Industry: Nutrition
- Founded: 1992; 34 years ago in Salt Lake City, Utah
- Founder: Myron Wentz
- Headquarters: Salt Lake City, Utah, United States
- Key people: Kevin Guest (CEO) Brent Neidig (Chief Commercial Officer)
- Products: Nutritional supplements, weight management, energy, personal care
- Revenue: US$ 1.186 billion (2021)
- Operating income: US$ 170.19 million (2021)
- Total assets: US$ 577.74 million (2021)
- Total equity: US$ 395.12 million (2021)
- Number of employees: 1,978 (2021)
- Website: usana.com

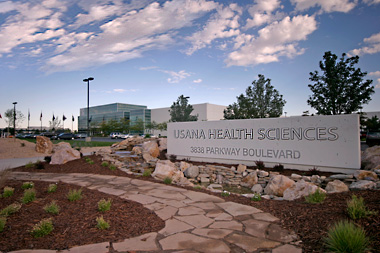
Headquarters in Salt Lake City, Utah

Usana Health Sciences, Inc., or USANA, is an American multi-level marketing company based in Salt Lake City, Utah. As of 2021, Usana was the 14th largest direct-selling company in the world by revenue. The company manufactures most of its nutritional products, dietary supplements, and skincare products at a Salt Lake City facility. Its products are sold in 24 countries via a network of independent distributors.

== History ==
In 1992, immunologist and microbiologist Myron Wentz moved his diagnostic testing company, Gull Laboratories, from Salt Lake City to West Valley City, Utah, and spun it into Usana Health Services, a multilevel marketing manufacturer of supplements. Beginning in 1993, Dallin A. Larsen served as Usana's vice president of sales (and later as a consultant to Usana's president and special advisor to the board of directors) prior to founding the MLM beverage company Monavie in 2005. Usana's products are not available through retail channels, and can only be obtained through one of its independent distributors (referred to as "associates") or by direct order through the company.

On 20 February 2007, Barry Minkow, founder of the Fraud Discovery Institute, distributed a 500-page report to officials at the U.S. Securities and Exchange Commission (SEC), the Federal Bureau of Investigation (FBI), and the Internal Revenue Service (IRS) accusing Usana of operating an illegal pyramid scheme. The SEC conducted an investigation of Usana's business practices in March 2007 and found nothing incriminating, concluding its inquiry with no enforcement action recommended. Minkow acknowledged that he was shorting Usana's shares, hoping to profit from a drop in the stock price. In April 2007, a class action lawsuit was filed that alleged Usana common stock had artificially inflated prices. In August 2007, Usana was notified by the Securities and Exchange Commission (SEC) that its shares were subject to delisting from the NASDAQ due to its Form 10-Q, and was determined to be in compliance that October.

In January 2008, a shareholder suit was filed with allegations that Usana had misled investors about the sustainability of its growth and business model. The cases were dismissed and the company was cleared by the U.S. Securities and Exchange Commission after an informal inquiry into the allegations, stating that it did "not intend to recommend any enforcement action by the Commission." Later that year, two Canadian Usana distributors were awarded $7 million in compensation for damages related to their wrongful dismissal from the company. The firm had terminated their positions in 2003 because it believed the distributor had violated the companies' policies and procedures.

Usana filed suits against Minkow and his company claiming defamation and stock manipulation. Usana dropped the defamation suit and in March 2008 U.S. District Judge Tena Campbell threw out four of the five claims brought by Usana against Minkow ruling that Usana's claims violated California's anti-SLAPP law for suing Minkow for fair criticism and that Usana did not show a reasonable probability of winning on those claims. The remaining charge of stock manipulation was settled in July 2008 when Usana and Minkow reached an undisclosed settlement, which included the removal of all Usana-related materials from the Fraud Discovery Institute website, a related Chinese website, and from YouTube. Minkow also agreed to never trade in Usana's stock again.

In December 2010, Usana completed the application process to transfer the listing of its common stock from the NASDAQ National Market System, which it had been trading on since 1996, to the New York Stock Exchange. The transfer became official at the beginning of 2011. It received drug-establishment registration from the Food and Drug Administration to manufacture over-the-counter drugs later that year. In 2012, 91% of product sales was purchased by associates. The company acquired BabyCare Ltd., a China-based prenatal supplement company, in 2013 and announced that it would build a manufacturing facility in the country.

By 2018, Usana had reported record revenue due to growth in the Asia Pacific region, though it recorded a 7% drop in net sales during its 2019 annual report. Usana has partnered with HealthCorps on health education for children and, in 2019, the Usana Foundation's Kids Eat program opened a facility to pack and distribute food for childhood hunger in the Utah area. It also was announced as the official nutritional partner of the Spartan Race endurance brand in the United States. Its sales for the first quarter of 2020 declined by 2.3 percent compared with 2019 numbers.

In February 2019, the Ministry of Commerce in China suspended operations for all multi-level marketing companies and participants to conduct a 100-day review of the health foods industry in the country due to exaggerated product advertising claims and questionable health products in the unregulated industry. Chinese departments initiated "Hundred Days of Action" to clean up the health market where 49 products from various companies were revoked, 54 food business licenses of various companies were revoked, 90 business licenses of various companies were revoked and 465 counterfeit and fake dens were destroyed. 85 companies, including BabyCare Ltd., a Usana subsidiary, signed a declaration to self-discipline and regulate operations with BabyCare speaking at an event hosted by the Chinese government.

== Corporate affairs ==
=== Leadership ===
In 2007, Usana faced repeated controversy after members of its board of directors, medical advisory board and several of its executives had made false statements regarding their qualifications including education and licenses.

Founder Myron Wentz was the company's chief executive officer from 1992 until 2008 when his son, Dave Wentz, succeeded him after working in positions such as president, executive vice president and senior vice president of strategic development. In 2015, Usana announced that the chief executive officer role would be divided between Wentz and Kevin Guest with the former taking global operations and for the latter, field development and sales. Guest was appointed the sole chief executive officer in November 2016.

=== Operations ===
Usana, a multilevel marketing company, sells its products primarily via non-employee distributors known as sales "associates" as well as via the Internet. The firm's 2010 income disclosure statement defines "associates" as those who are actively building a business, acting as wholesale buyers, or are new distributors. The firm's 2009 SEC 10-K filing draws a distinction between associates and preferred customers. Associates are independent distributors of Usana products who also purchase their products for personal use. Preferred customers may purchase products, at wholesale prices, strictly for personal use and are not permitted to resell or to distribute. As of July 2011, the firm had 222,000 active Associates and 68,000 preferred customers.

Associates may be eligible to receive commissions based on their own product sales as well as through sales made by any new distributors they recruit. According to documentation from Usana corporate, 87 percent of associates fail to make enough from commissions to recover the cost of their qualifying purchases with 67 percent of all associates making no commission; 72.2 percent of the company's commissions are earned by the top 2.31 percent of associates. According to a 2011 article published by the Salt Lake City Tribune, the firm's FY09 income disclosure statement indicated that the average yearly income of the company's 165,710 associates, which includes those just starting out, was $617, while the "top-of-the-pyramid distributors earn an average of $857,865 annually".

=== Sponsorships ===
Usana has been a paid sponsor of various athletic organizations. Usana offers an "Athlete Guarantee Program" to select sponsored athletes. The program permits selected participants to enter into an agreement with company stipulating that, should an athlete enrolled in the program test positive for a banned substance (included in World Anti-Doping Agency regulations) as a result of taking Usana products, the company will compensate the athlete up to two times his or her current annual earnings up to $1 million USD.

In 2006, Usana signed a co-sponsorship agreement with the WTA tour and extended the agreement in 2011. As part of the agreement in 2011, Usana donated $1 to Children's Hunger Fund for every ace scored at a WTA tournament beginning at Wimbledon and continuing through the end of the season.

In 2003, Usana became the title sponsor of the USANA Amphitheatre, an outdoor amphitheatre based in West Valley City, Utah with a seating capacity of 20,000. In May 2012, United Concerts announced a continued naming rights partnership with USANA Health Sciences through March 2018.

In lead up to the 2020 Summer Olympics, Usana announced partnerships with USA Swimming and the USA Skateboarding National Team. It was the official multivitamin sponsor of USA Swimming and official nutritional supplement supplier of USA Skateboarding. The partnerships reportedly extended into multi-year agreements.

== Products ==
Usana produces three product lines: Usana Nutritionals (Cellsentials, Optimizers, and Digestion/Detox nutritional supplements), Usana Diet & Energy (Reset meal replacement shakes, protein bars, and Rev3 energy drinks), and Sensé & Celavive personal care (skin care, skin treatment, and hair & body care products).

Usana Essentials were tested in 2011 by ConsumerLab.com in their Multivitamin and Multimineral Supplements Review of 38 of the leading multivitamin/multimineral products sold in the U.S. and Canada. The Essentials passed ConsumerLab's test, which included testing of selected index elements, their ability to disintegrate in solution per United States Pharmacopeia guidelines, lead contamination threshold set in California Proposition 65, and meeting U.S. Food and Drug Administration (FDA) labeling requirements.

As of 2019, its products are marketed in the United States, Canada, Australia, New Zealand, Hong Kong, Japan, Taiwan, South Korea, Singapore, Mexico, Malaysia, the Netherlands, the United Kingdom, Caribbean, Puerto Rico, Philippines, France, China, Spain, Italy, Germany, Romania, Denmark, Colombia and Indonesia.

== Reception ==
From 2004 to 2006, Usana was named on Forbes "200 Best Small Companies" list. In 2007, a Forbes article quoted industry experts and government officials who had raised questions about the cost of Usana's supplements as well as its business practices. Radio-Canada later aired an investigative report that examined the company's products, pricing and "misleading income claims" made to potential associates concerning revenue. It included hidden camera filming of recruitment and other sessions, which found one group of associates appeared to violate the company's policies and distributor agreements. This contrasted the Canadian legal requirements for multi-level marketing companies to provide clear, frequent and complete information about the revenue of the typical participant. In addition, the same group of associates were filmed making recommendations for using Usana products to treat illnesses including leukemia.

John Cloud, senior writer for Time Magazine, conducted an evaluation of nutritional supplements in which he took a regimen of Usana pills, protein bars, powder drinks and psyllium fiber as recommended by the company's online evaluation. Cloud took a blood test prior to taking the products to determine the levels of calcium, protein, sodium, cholesterol, glucose, and other substances, and then was tested again five months after taking the supplement regimen, which included 3,000 pills at a cost of $1,200. The follow-up test revealed a change in only two values; a 75% increase in vitamin D levels (attributed to the vitamin D3 supplement Cloud had been taking) and a 28 mg/dl increase in high-density lipoprotein, which could not be accounted for. Cloud also experienced a placebo response where that act of taking the supplements made him feel more vigorous despite no physiological reasons being present. This response also led to a 10-lb increase in weight, as the belief he was more vigorous led to his making poorer dietary decisions—a phenomenon referred to as the "licensing effect".

New Zealand government statistician for the Commerce Commission, Murray H. Smith, who served as an expert witness in every pyramid scheme case brought by the Commission preceding 10 years, opined in 2008 that very few Usana distributors are likely to become wealthy, and stating "you can make a very strong argument that this could be a pyramid scheme." When asked by the National Business Review to review the firm's business structure and compensation plan, it was Smith's opinion, from a statistical not legal standpoint, that the firm demonstrated a number of characteristics commonly occurring in pyramid schemes including that most members recoup less than what they pay to participate; that those at the top of the structure are more likely to make more than those on the bottom of the structure; and that as the company grows it will become harder to recruit others. Smith also noted the company's significant turnover in distributors making it necessary to continually recruit.
