= Ralph E. Pomeroy =

United States Army Medal of Honor recipient

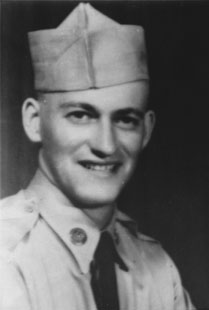
- Medal of Honor recipient Ralph Pomeroy
- Born: March 26, 1930; Quinwood, West Virginia, US
- Died: October 15, 1952 (aged 22); Near Kumhwa, Chorwon County, Kangwon Province, Korea
- Burial place: End of the Trail Cemetery, Clintonville, West Virginia, US
- Military career
- Allegiance: United States
- Branch: United States Army
- Rank: Private First Class
- Units: Company E, 31st Infantry Regiment, 7th Infantry Division
- Conflicts: Korean War: Battle of Triangle Hill †
- Awards: Medal of Honor; Purple Heart

Ralph Eugene Pomeroy (March 26, 1930 – October 15, 1952) was a soldier in the United States Army during the Korean War. He received the Medal of Honor for his actions on October 15, 1952, during the Battle of Triangle Hill.

== Medal of Honor citation ==
Rank and organization: Private First Class, U.S. Army, Company E, 31st Infantry Regiment, 7th Infantry Division

Place and date: Near Triangle Hill, Korea, October 15, 1952

Entered service at: Quinwood, West Virginia. Born: March 26, 1930, Quinwood, West Virginia.

G.O. No.: 97, December 30, 1953

Citation:

Pfc. Pomeroy, a machine gunner with Company E, distinguished himself by conspicuous gallantry and indomitable courage above and beyond the call of duty in action against the enemy. While his comrades were consolidating on a key terrain feature, he manned a machine gun at the end of a communication trench on the forward slope to protect the platoon flank and prevent a surprise attack. When the enemy attacked through a ravine leading directly to his firing position, he immediately opened fire on the advancing troops inflicting a heavy toll in casualties and blunting the assault. At this juncture the enemy directed intense concentrations of artillery and mortar fire on his position in an attempt to neutralize his gun. Despite withering fire and bursting shells, he maintained his heroic stand and poured crippling fire into the ranks of the hostile force until a mortar burst severely wounded him and rendered the gun mount inoperable. Quickly removing the hot, heavy weapon, he cradled it in his arms and, moving forward with grim determination, raked the attacking forces with a hail of fire. Although wounded a second time he pursued his relentless course until his ammunition was expended within 10 feet of the foe and then, using the machine gun as a club, he courageously closed with the enemy in hand-to-hand combat until mortally wounded. Pfc. Pomeroy's consummate valor, inspirational actions and supreme sacrifice enabled the platoon to contain the attack and maintain the integrity of the perimeter, reflecting lasting glory upon himself and upholding the noble traditions of the military service.

== Awards and decorations ==

| Badge | Combat Infantryman Badge | | |
| 1st row | Medal of Honor | Purple Heart | National Defense Service Medal |
| 2nd row | Korean Service Medal with 1 Campaign star | United Nations Service Medal Korea | Korean War Service Medal Retroactively Awarded, 2003 |
| Unit Awards | Korean Presidential Unit Citation | | |

7th Infantry Division Insignia

== Finnigan's War ==
Ralph E. Pomeroy is one of the featured Korean War heroes honored in the 2013 documentary "Finnigan's War" directed by Conor Timmis. Actor Mark Hamill narrates Pomeroy's Medal of Honor citation in the film. Filmmaker Conor Timmis interviewed Pomeroy's family on board the US Navy ship USNS Pomeroy. Also interviewed in the scene are Pomeroy's commanding officer Sam Mosley and Captain Mike Finnigan of the USNS Pomeroy.

== See also ==
- Huang Jiguang
- List of Medal of Honor recipients
- List of Korean War Medal of Honor recipients
