= Con Man (film) =

- Theatrical release poster
- Directed by: Bruce Caulk
- Starring: James Caan; Ving Rhames; Justin Baldoni; Elizabeth Röhm; Mark Hamill; Talia Shire; Armand Assante
- Release date: March 15, 2018 (La Jolla)
- Running time: 100 minutes
- Country: United States
- Language: English

Con Man is a 2018 American crime drama film directed by Bruce Caulk and starring James Caan, Ving Rhames, Justin Baldoni, Elisabeth Röhm, Mark Hamill, Talia Shire and Armand Assante. It is based on the real-life story of Barry Minkow, who also appears in the film.

== Plot ==
In 1982, 16-year-old Barry Minkow is an ambitious high school student in Reseda, working at a gym and a carpet-cleaning business. He obtains steroids from a gym member named Victor, who gives him a loan to open his own carpet-cleaning business, “ZZZZ Best”. As a teenage entrepreneur, Barry revels in the attention from his classmates and the local news, until his bank realizes he is a minor and cancels his accounts. Desperate to stay in business, he steals money orders to pay his debt to Victor, and convinces another bank to give him an account.

After expenses like a new sports car and expanding the still-struggling company, Barry resorts to check kiting, forging credit card statements, and stages an office break-in, paying a crooked insurance adjuster to ensure a fraudulent claims payout. His overinflated success goes to his head, alienating him from his friend and employee Mike. In 1984, Barry turns 18 and graduates high school, and his uncle introduces him to lucrative insurance contracts for restoring water damage. He puts Barry in touch with Jack Saxon, an organized crime-connected businessman who offers to finance ZZZZ Best in exchange for splitting the profits.

Confronted by his bank over the credit card fraud, Barry and his adjuster form a fake appraisal company to verify ZZZZ Best’s fraudulent restoration contracts; combined with Saxon’s money, this allows Barry to settle with the bank, and his company continues to grow. Approached by FBI Agent Gamble, Barry declines to testify against Saxon. Barry and his adjuster falsify tens of thousands of documents to inflate the company’s value, misrepresenting that they handle millions of dollars in non-existent restorations; in Sacramento, Barry stages a walkthrough for investors of a restoration site where ZZZZ Best never worked.

In 1986, Barry and Saxon take the company public, having illegally pumped and dumped the stock. Celebrating his 20th birthday and his net worth of $100 million, Barry is rebuked by his mother for valuing money over morality. A newspaper exposé reveals Barry’s previous credit card fraud, leading the company’s stock to plummet and banks to call in their loans. Learning Saxon has sold all his shares, Barry holds a press conference to refute the accusations against him, but the phony Sacramento project is made public and his investment banking firm resigns. After a confrontation with Mike, Barry is forced to face the consequences: convicted of 57 counts of fraud, he is sentenced to 25 years in prison, and ordered to pay $26 million in restitution.

By 1994, Barry (now played by Minkow himself) has been incarcerated at Englewood Federal Prison for years. Supposedly counseled by fellow inmate James “Peanut” Long, Barry becomes a born-again Christian. He is interviewed by Agent Gamble about his crimes, and still refuses to testify against Saxon, but is paroled. Hired as a church pastor, Barry is now married with twins, teaching fraud prevention at the FBI Academy. Don, a parishioner revealed to be Mike’s uncle, asks Barry to look into his retirement hedge fund manager, Derek Lewis. Suspecting a Ponzi scheme, Barry persuades Gamble to send him undercover to the Bahamas, where he offers Lewis a fake $5 million to invest for the church in exchange for releasing Don’s funds. Returning home, Barry withholds the bogus investment when Don only receives half his money, leading Lewis to sue Don, Barry, and the church for millions. Arranging a meeting to record Lewis incriminating himself, Barry blows his cover, but Lewis is arrested and Don’s money is recovered.

Real-life interviews question Barry’s version of events, and it is revealed that he defrauded millions of dollars from the church and its parishioners. By 2011, he is serving consecutive five-year sentences for insider trading and embezzling church donations, owing over $500 million in restitution.

== Cast ==
- Barry Minkow as himself
  - Justin Baldoni as Young Barry Minkow
- Mark Hamill as Robert Minkow
- Talia Shire as Carol Minkow
- James Caan as FBI Agent Gamble
- Gianni Russo as Derek Lewis
- Ving Rhames as "Peanut"
- Elizabeth Röhm as Lisa Minkow
- Armand Assante as Jack Saxon
