= Myron W. Wentz =

American-born Kittitian businessman

- Born: August 13, 1940 (age 86); Napoleon, North Dakota, United States
- Citizenship: Saint Kitts and Nevis
- Education: North Central College, University of North Dakota, The University of Utah
- Occupation: Businessman
- Known for: Founder and former CEO of direct selling business USANA Health Sciences
- Children: 3

Myron W. Wentz (born 1940) is an American-born Kittitian billionaire businessman and microbiologist who is the founder, chairman emeritus, and former CEO of USANA Health Sciences, a Utah-based multilevel marketing company that sells nutritional products and dietary supplements.

== Early life and education ==
Went was born in North Dakota in 1940 and obtained a BSc degree in biology from North Central College in Naperville, Illinois, an MSc degree in microbiology from the University of North Dakota, and a PhD degree in microbiology and immunology from the University of Utah.

== Career ==
In 1974, Wentz launched Gull Laboratories as a one-man operation and developed a test for diagnosing Epstein-Barr virus infection. The company was later sold to Fresenius, a German medical products company, in 1994, although Wentz continued as Chairman until 1998. Wentz sold his controlling interests in Gull Laboratories in 1992 and founded USANA Health Sciences in the same year.

Wentz also founded the Sanoviv Medical Institute in 1998, an alternative and holistic medicine center located near Rosarito, Mexico. Wentz served as President of Sanoviv from 1999-2010. The current president is Seth Miller, USANA’s former Director of International Business Development.

Wentz and his family are the sole owners of Gull Holdings, Ltd., an Isle of Man company, which in turn, is controlled by an entity registered in Liechtenstein, both well known tax haven countries. Through Gull Holdings, Wentz owns 51% of USANA.

== Shareholder lawsuit ==
On April 4, 2007, Wentz was named as a defendant in a class-action lawsuit brought against USANA by company shareholders. The suit alleged that USANA presented materially false and misleading information about the company’s financial situation and business practices. Included in the allegations were that USANA's business model was unsustainable and amounted to a pyramid scheme. The suit cited several allegations from a report released by Barry Minkow and the Fraud Discovery Institute.

== Citizenship ==
Wentz has been criticized for having renounced his American citizenship in the mid-nineties, and for now claiming citizenship in Saint Kitts and Nevis, reportedly due to tax purposes as the country is known for being a tax haven. Former USANA CFO, Gilbert Fuller, responded to this criticism by stating that Wentz's decision to renounce his US citizenship had nothing to do with the company. Wentz and his companion, Prudence Conley, now live in Rosarito, Mexico.

== Philanthropy ==
Wentz donated $10 million to his alma mater, North Central College, which helped to fund construction of the Wentz Concert Hall, a $30 million performing arts facility named after Wentz. In June 2011, the College awarded Wentz an honorary doctor of science degree for lifetime achievement in the sciences. Wentz was the benefactor of the Dr. Myron Wentz Science Center at North Central College, which was due to be formally dedicated in October 2017.

== Bibliography ==
=== Books ===
- Wentz M. A mouth full of poison. Rosarito Beach, Baja California:Medicis, S.C.; 2004.
- Wentz M. Invisible miracles. Rosarito Beach, Baja California:Medicis, S.C.; 2002.
- Wentz M. and Wentz, D. The Healthy Home; 2010

=== Scientific papers ===
- Preobrazhensky S, Malugin A, Wentz M. "Flow cytometric assay for evaluation of the effects of cell density on cytotoxicity and induction of apoptosis". Cytometry 2001;43(3):199-203.
- Mazumder P, Chuang HY, Wentz MW, Wiedbrauk DL. "Latex agglutination test for detection of antibodies to Toxoplasma gondii". J Clin Microbiol 1988;26(11):2444-46.
- McNeil C, Ladle JN, Helmick WM, Trentelman E, Wentz MW. "An antiserum to ovarian mucinous cyst fluid with colon cancer specificity". Cancer Research 1969;29(8):1535-40.
- Wentz MW, Scott RA, Vennes JW. "Clostridium botulinum type F: Seasonal inhibition by Bacillus lichenoformis". Science 1967;155(758): 89-90.
