= Fraud Discovery Institute =

Corporate Fraud Investigation Unit setup by FBI

Fraud Discovery Institute was the name of an American short selling investment firm run by conman Barry Minkow. It presented itself as seeking to assist in the prosecution of perpetrators of corporate fraud. After FDI had researched an alleged white-collar crime and taken a short position in the company's stock, it would give a report to the FBI, which could then find and arrest the criminals.

The Fraud Discovery Institute was founded by Barry Minkow in 2001. Minkow had been released from prison in 1995, where he was serving a sentence for a Ponzi scheme involving a carpet-cleaning company called ZZZZ Best. Other former convicts were also involved in the Fraud Discovery Institute; the rest of the team was composed of auditors. In September 2011, Minkow was returned to prison after making false statements in the Fraud Discovery Institute's reports. Nonetheless, he managed to defraud the church at which he had been serving as pastor. In January 2014 he pleaded guilty to embezzling more than $3 million from the Church and its congregants, with incidents stretching back to 2001.
