= Mark Hamill =

American actor (born 1951)

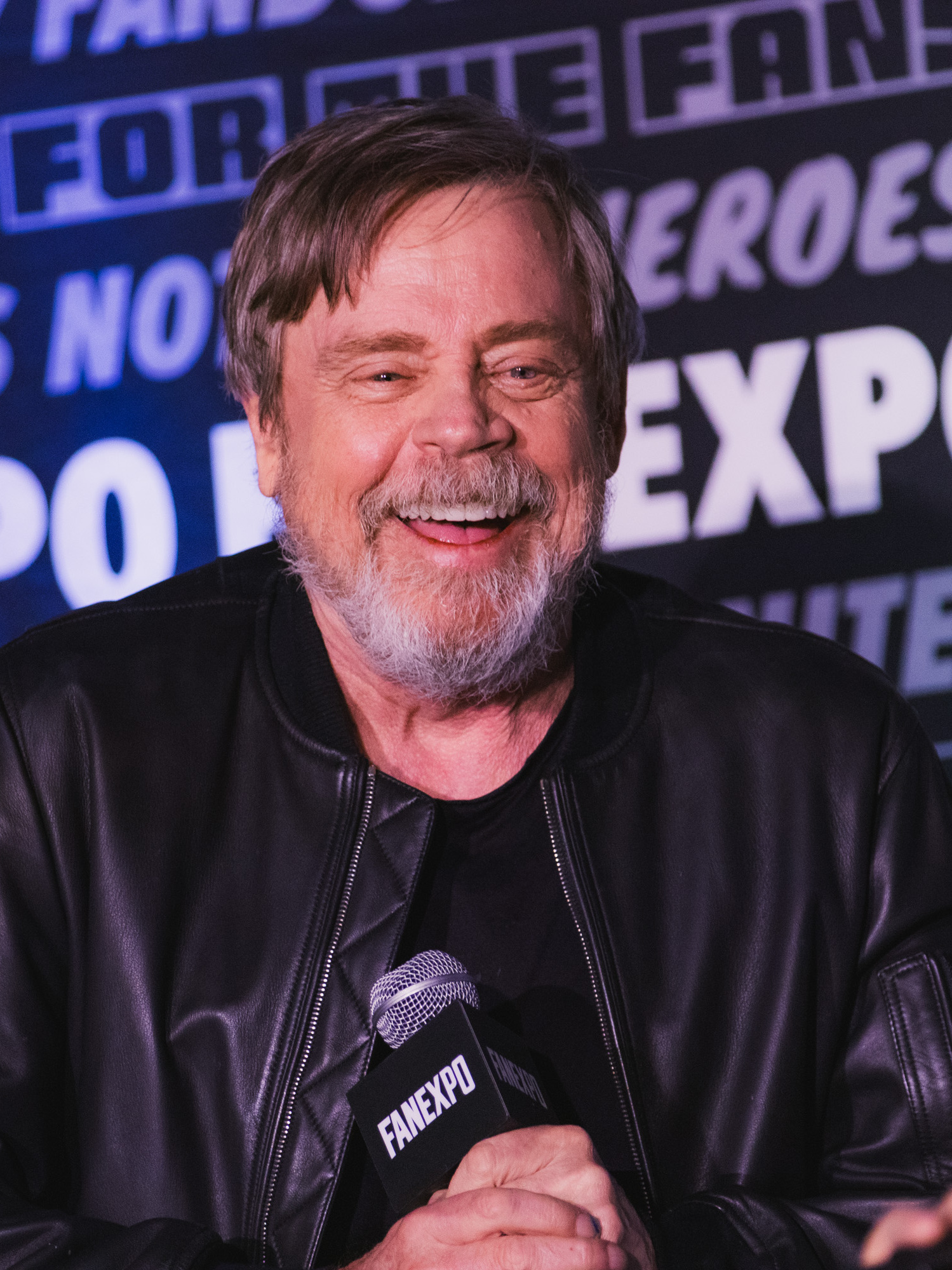
- Hamill in 2026
- Born: Mark Richard Hamill; September 25, 1951 (age 75); Oakland, California, U.S.
- Education: Los Angeles City College (AA)
- Occupation: Actor
- Years active: 1969–present
- Works: Full list
- Spouse: Marilou York (m. 1978)
- Children: 3

Mark Richard Hamill (/ˈhæməl/; born September 25, 1951) is an American actor. He rose to fame as Luke Skywalker in the original Star Wars trilogy (1977–1983), leading to further lead parts in films like Corvette Summer (1978) and Samuel Fuller's The Big Red One (1980).

Through the 1980s, Hamill distinguished himself from his role in Star Wars by pursuing a theatre career on Broadway, starring in productions of The Elephant Man (1980), Amadeus (1983), and The Nerd (1987). Starting in the 1990s, Hamill began to work primarily as a voice actor for animated film, television, and video games, with the Joker in multiple pieces of DC Comics media, starting with Batman: The Animated Series in 1992, being his most well-known voice role. For his role of the Joker, he was nominated for two Annie Awards and won a BAFTA Game Award. His other animated roles include the Hobgoblin in Spider-Man: The Animated Series (1994–1998), Fire Lord Ozai in Avatar: The Last Airbender (2005–2008), Mr. Salacia and Senator Stampingston in Metalocalypse (2006–2013, 2023), and Skips in Regular Show (2010–2017) and The Lost Tapes (2026–present).

Hamill returned to mainstream prominence when he reprised his Luke Skywalker role in the Star Wars sequel trilogy (2015–2019). He followed this with live-action roles in Brigsby Bear (2017), the Netflix miniseries The Fall of the House of Usher (2023), The Life of Chuck (2024), and The Long Walk (2025).

== Early life ==
Mark Richard Hamill was born on September 25, 1951, in Oakland, California. His father, William Thomas Hamill, was a U.S. Navy captain. He is one of seven children, with two brothers, Will and Patrick, and four sisters, Terry, Jan, Jeanie, and Kim. His father has English, Irish, Scottish, and Welsh ancestry and his mother was of half Swedish and half English descent. Hamill has described his father as a staunch Roman Catholic, and "Nixon Republican". Hamill has stated that he had a troubled relationship with his father who could not understand his childhood obsession with movies and comic books, seeing them as frivolous things that he should outgrow.

His father's changes of station and attendant family moves led to the Hamill children switching schools often. During his elementary years, he attended Walsingham Academy in Williamsburg, Virginia, and Edgar Allan Poe Middle School in Annandale, Virginia. At age 11, he moved to the 5900 block of Castleton Drive in San Diego, California, where he attended Hale Junior High School. During his first year at James Madison High School in San Diego, his family moved back to Virginia, and Hamill attended Annandale High School. By his junior year, his father was stationed in Japan, where Hamill attended and was a member of the Drama Club at Nile C. Kinnick High School, from which he graduated in 1969. He later enrolled at Los Angeles City College, majoring in drama.

== Career ==
=== Beginnings ===
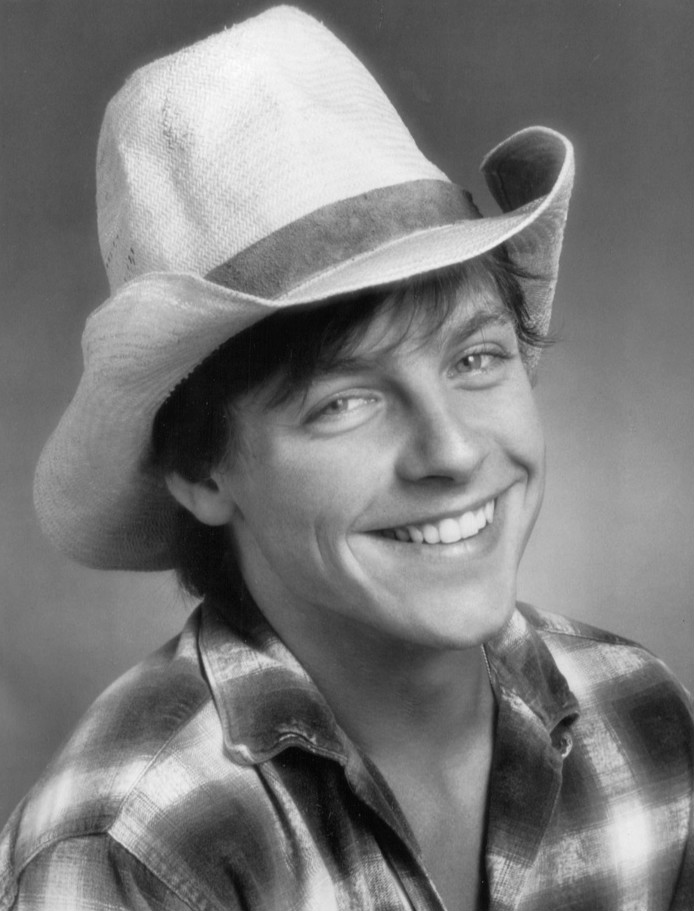
Hamill in The Texas Wheelers, 1975

Hamill's early career included a recurring role on the soap opera General Hospital, and a starring role on the short-lived sitcom The Texas Wheelers. He portrayed the oldest son, David, in the pilot episode of Eight Is Enough, though the role was later performed by Grant Goodeve. He also had guest appearances on The Bill Cosby Show, The Partridge Family, Room 222 and One Day at a Time.

=== Star Wars ===
==== 1977–1983: Original trilogy ====
Robert Englund was auditioning for a role in Apocalypse Now when he walked across the hall to where auditions were taking place for George Lucas's Star Wars. After watching the auditions for a while, he realized that Hamill, his friend, would be perfect for the role of Luke Skywalker. He suggested to Hamill that he audition for the role; as it turned out, Hamill's agent had already set up the audition that gave him the role. During his screen test, Hamill presumed that he was playing a sidekick to Harrison Ford's Han Solo and was unsure whether or not the film was supposed to be a comedy.

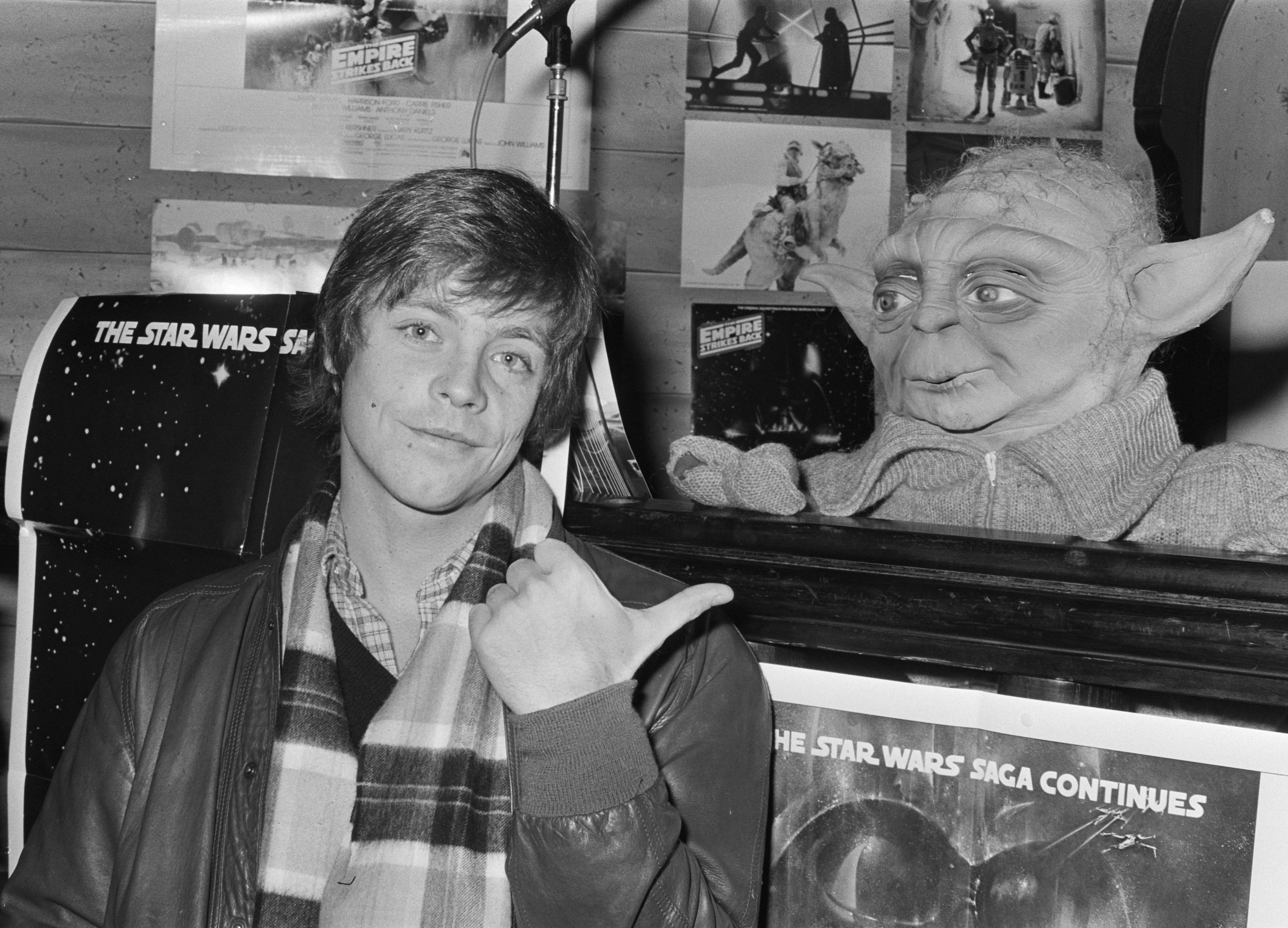
Hamill in Amsterdam in 1980

Released in May 1977, Star Wars was an enormous, unexpected success and had a huge effect on the film industry. Hamill went on to appear in the less-than-successful Star Wars Holiday Special in 1978, and later starred in the successful film sequels The Empire Strikes Back and Return of the Jedi. In January 1977 Hamill had been involved in a serious car accident, fracturing his nose and left cheekbone. The accident was the reason why Empire starts with his character's injury. False rumors spread that his face had required plastic surgery. For his part in both of the sequels, Hamill was honored with the Saturn Award for Best Actor, given by the Academy of Science Fiction, Fantasy and Horror Films.

In 1980, he made a guest appearance on The Muppet Show, both as himself and as Luke Skywalker in the episode The Stars of Star Wars. The crossover episode also starred Anthony Daniels as C-3PO and R2-D2, who joined Luke on a search for Chewbacca. In 1982, he appeared as both himself and Luke Skywalker in an unreleased live-action mockumentary filmed on the set of Return of the Jedi titled Return of the Ewok.

Hamill reprised the role of Luke Skywalker for the radio dramatizations of both Star Wars and The Empire Strikes Back. For the Return of the Jedi radio drama, the role was played by a different actor.

Editions of Joseph Campbell's The Hero with a Thousand Faces (which influenced Lucas as he was developing the films) issued after the release of Star Wars in 1977 used the image of Hamill as Luke Skywalker on the cover.

Hamill has appeared in several documentaries, including The Making of Star Wars and Empire of Dreams: The Story of the Star Wars Trilogy. He also narrated the 1980 documentary, SP FX: The Empire Strikes Back and the 1983 documentary, From Star Wars to Jedi: The Making of a Saga.

==== 2014–2025: Return to the Star Wars franchise ====
Hamill returned to the Star Wars universe in 2014, when he voiced the ancient Sith Lord Darth Bane in the last episode of season 6 of the animated series The Clone Wars. He was nominated for a Daytime Emmy Award for his performance.

Following its acquisition of Lucasfilm, The Walt Disney Company released more Star Wars films, starting with The Force Awakens on December 18, 2015. Initially, both Disney and Hamill were coy about whether Hamill would be a cast member. Hamill and Fisher met Lucas at Star Wars Celebration Orlando. It was reported that Hamill had been assigned a nutritionist and personal trainer ahead of production. In September 2013, Hamill's friend Robert Englund confirmed that "they've got Mark in the gym because Mark's coming back as Luke Skywalker." In 2014, it was announced that Hamill would reprise his role in The Force Awakens. Despite having top billing, Hamill only appears briefly at the end of the film (with no dialogue) in a cliffhanger set-up for the sequel. The film received positive reviews, was the highest-grossing film of 2015, grossed $2.07 billion worldwide and became the third-highest-grossing film at the time of its release.

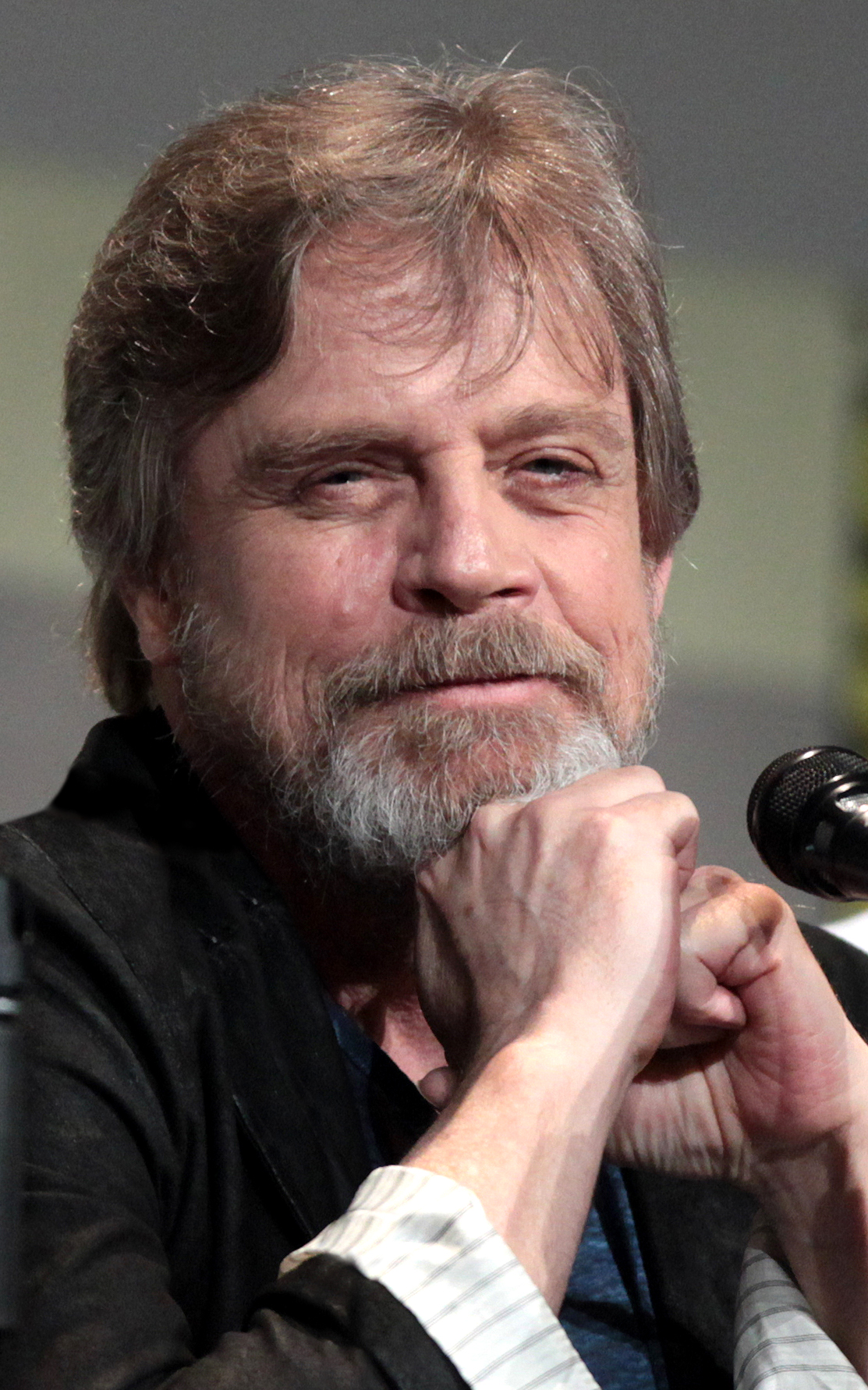
Hamill in 2015

Hamill played Skywalker again in Star Wars: The Last Jedi, released on December 15, 2017. Hamill was initially critical of his own role in the film, stating that he and director Rian Johnson had "a fundamental difference" regarding Skywalker's characterization. Hamill later expressed regret for having made those statements, calling the film an "all-time great". He played Skywalker again in Star Wars: The Rise of Skywalker, the last instalment of the nine part Skywalker saga.

Hamill also had voice cameos as Dobbu Scay in The Last Jedi, Boolio in The Rise of Skywalker, and EV-9D9 in the fifth episode of The Mandalorian. He had similar cameos in The Force Awakens, Rogue One, and Solo: A Star Wars Story in undisclosed roles, for which he was credited as "William M. Patrick" and "Patrick Williams".

Hamill was digitally de-aged to reprise his role as Skywalker in the season 2 finale of The Mandalorian and the sixth chapter of the spin-off series The Book of Boba Fett. (Note: This was due to The Mandalorian and The Book of Boba Fett being set five years after the events of Return of the Jedi. Luke Skywalker was born 19 years before the events of A New Hope so would have been 28 years old during both series.) He also appeared in Disney Gallery: The Mandalorian. In 2021, Hamill praised the prequel trilogy for having "their own identity".

Hamill voiced the animator in the Star Wars webisode of How NOT to Draw and reprised his role in Lego Star Wars: Rebuild the Galaxy.

Hamill attended several conventions as part of Star Wars Celebration as a guest.

In an interview in May 2025, Hamill said that he would not portray Luke Skywalker again saying, "I had my time. I'm appreciative of that, but I really think they should focus on the future and all the new characters." Despite this, it was announced in August 2025 that he would make a guest appearance in LEGO Star Wars: Rebuild the Galaxy: Pieces of the Past.

=== Other work ===
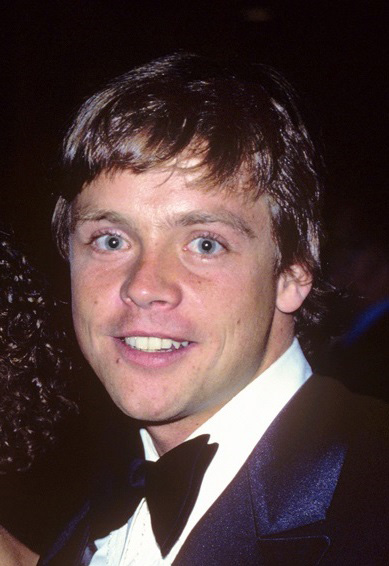
Hamill at the premiere of F.I.S.T. in 1978

After the success of Star Wars, Hamill found that audiences identified him very closely with Luke Skywalker. He became a teen idol, appearing on the cover of teen magazines such as Tiger Beat. He attempted to avoid being typecast by appearing in the 1978 film Corvette Summer and the 1980 World War II film The Big Red One. He also appeared in The Night the Lights Went Out in Georgia (1981) and Britannia Hospital (1982). Further distancing himself from his early blockbuster role, Hamill started acting on Broadway, starring in plays such as The Elephant Man (1979), Amadeus (1983), Harrigan 'N Hart (1985, for which he received a Drama Desk Award nomination), Room Service (1986) and The Nerd (1987–88). When Amadeus was adapted for film in 1984, Hamill auditioned to reprise his role as Mozart, but lost the part to Tom Hulce. A studio executive told the producers of the film, "I don't want Luke Skywalker in this film". The film director, Milos Forman told Hamill that, "No one is believing that the Luke Skywalker is the Mozart." Hamill also made television appearances—in a 1986 episode of Amazing Stories and a 1987 episode of Alfred Hitchcock Presents.

After a six-year hiatus from film, Hamill returned to the big screen in the 1989 science-fiction film Slipstream. He continued to star in films throughout the 1990s, including Midnight Ride and The Guyver in 1991, the 1995 remake of Village of the Damned, and the 1998 Swedish action film Hamilton. Hamill appeared in Jay and Silent Bob Strike Back (2001) as the supervillain Cocknocker, a role that is a parody both of himself and of roles he played in the past.

His television work includes a guest appearance as the Trickster on two episodes of The Flash (1990), cameo appearances on MADtv as the estranged father of Ms. Swan, and an appearance on Saturday Night Live, in which he played himself being sold in a Star Wars-themed home shopping sale. He appeared in single episodes of 3rd Rock from the Sun (1997), and Just Shoot Me! (1998), in two episodes of seaQuest DSV (1995) as Tobias LeConte, and in the episode "Mind over Matter" of the series The Outer Limits (1995).

When the Wing Commander series of computer games started using full motion video cut scenes, Hamill was cast as the series protagonist, Colonel Christopher Blair, a role he played in Wing Commander III: Heart of the Tiger, Wing Commander IV: The Price of Freedom and Wing Commander: Prophecy. In the 1999 Wing Commander film, Blair was played by Freddie Prinze Jr., although Hamill had a voice cameo. Hamill appears in Squadron 42—the single-player campaign from the Star Citizen computer-game universe—as Lieutenant Commander Steve "Old Man" Colton.

In 2003, Hamill starred in the two-hander play Six Dance Lessons in Six Weeks as the acerbic dance instructor Michael Minetti. He played opposite Rue McClanahan for the season at the Coconut Grove Playhouse in Miami, and opposite Polly Bergen when the production moved to Broadway.

Hamill also directed and starred in the 2004 direct-to-DVD film Comic Book: The Movie. Having been a comic-book fan who attended science-fiction and comics conventions before becoming famous, Hamill said his character was based on an exaggerated version of himself. He and his crew shot most of the "mockumentary" film during the 2002 San Diego Comic-Con and enlisted Stan Lee, Kevin Smith, Bruce Campbell and Hugh Hefner in small roles. The movie won an award for Best Live-Action DVD Premiere Movie at the 2005 DVD Exclusive Awards.

In 2011, Hamill appeared as a villain in the fifth season of the NBC series Chuck. He appeared in the television series Criminal Minds—in the last two episodes of season eight—as John Curtis (also known as "The Replicator"), a serial killer who stalks the BAU team throughout the show's eighth season. He also made a guest appearance alongside George Takei in the season one finale of the ABC sitcom The Neighbors as Commandant Bill.

Hamill starred in the 2011 Hungarian film Thelomeris, a project on which he also served as a creative consultant. Thelomeris was the first mainstream science-fiction film to be produced in Hungary. The following year, Hamill starred in two more live-action films: the British horror film Airborne and the independent film Sushi Girl. Airborne was received negatively by critics and audiences. Hamill said the dark tone of Sushi Girl pulled him out of his comfort zone, but he was grateful that it did.

In 2014, Hamill appeared in the film Kingsman: The Secret Service as James Arnold, a professor from Imperial College London and an expert on climate change. He also reprised his role as the Trickster in The CW's 2014 live-action series The Flash, appearing in the seventeenth episode of the first season, the ninth episode of the second season, and the ninth episode of the third season. Hamill starred in the 2018 film Con Man, an independent film about the life of famous con man Barry Minkow. Hamill played Minkow's father, Robert Minkow.

Hamill appeared in the second season of the historical-fiction drama series Knightfall, which premiered in 2019. He portrayed Master Talus, a veteran Templar who trains the initiates at the Chartres Temple. In April 2022, it was announced that Hamill would make an appearance on the revival of the series The Kids in the Hall, which was set to be released on Amazon Prime Video the following month, on May 13.

In 2024, he appeared in The Life of Chuck, directed by Mike Flanagan and based on the 2020 novella of the same name by Stephen King. His performance was praised in reviews of the film by Thomas Floyd of The Washington Post and by Peter Travers among others, and commended by King himself.

=== Voice acting ===
==== General work ====
Hamill first performed voice acting work in the early 1970s, voicing the character Corey Anders on the Saturday morning cartoon Jeannie by Hanna-Barbera Productions. He later played Sean in the Ralph Bakshi film Wizards, which was released just three months before Star Wars in 1977. The voice role he is most known for is Batman's archenemy the Joker, the success of which has led him to portray a wide variety of characters in television, film, anime, and video games (mostly similar super-villains).

Hamill was the voice of The Hobgoblin in the 1990s Spider-Man animated series. His other Marvel superhero genre roles include the Gargoyle in the animated series The Incredible Hulk, Maximus in Fantastic Four, Klaw in The Avengers: Earth's Mightiest Heroes and multiple characters in Ultimate Spider-Man. Hamill voiced Solomon Grundy and Trickster in the DC Animated Universe series Justice League and Justice League Unlimited, and played the murderous gangster Tony Zucco in The Batman, an animated series unrelated to the various series in the DC animated universe. He voiced Spectre in an episode of Batman: The Brave and the Bold, and provided the voice of archvillain Kavaxas in the fifth and final season of 2012's Teenage Mutant Ninja Turtles.

Non-comic-related television roles include the deranged shock jock anchorman Dr. Jak in Phantom 2040, Principal John Smith in the Totally Spies episode "Soul Collector", Christopher "Maverick" Blair in Wing Commander Academy, the Walter Lantz character Buzz Buzzard in The New Woody Woodpecker Show, the flamboyant robot Lawrance "Larry" 3000 in Time Squad, the pirate Captain Stickybeard in Codename: Kids Next Door, Fire Lord Ozai in Avatar: The Last Airbender, the Skeleton King in Super Robot Monkey Team Hyperforce Go!, multiple roles in Metalocalypse, and the groundskeeper Skips in Regular Show. He also voiced himself in two episodes of the Disney animated series Pepper Ann.

Hamill guest-starred as himself in The Simpsons episode "Mayored to the Mob". On the accompanying audio commentary, he said he was a fan of the show since its 1987 debut on The Tracey Ullman Show, and that it was a personal thrill to work with Dan Castellaneta, the voice of Homer Simpson. He has also guest-starred in Family Guy, and was a recurring voice actor on Seth Green's Robot Chicken.

In addition to television voice acting, Hamill has starred in multiple animated films such as The Captain of the Guard in Sinbad: Beyond the Veil of Mists, the biblical figure Judah in Joseph: King of Dreams, the evil wolf Niju in Balto II: Wolf Quest, and Chanukah Zombie in Futurama: Bender's Big Score. He was also the voice of Headmaster Matthew Callahan in the 1998 American adult animated superhero film Gen 13.

He also voiced Colonel Muska in the second English-language version of Castle in the Sky, and the Mayor of Pejite in the dubbed English version of Nausicaä of the Valley of the Wind, both directed by Hayao Miyazaki and distributed by Disney. Hamill also provided the voice of the Granduncle in the English-language dub of Miyazaki's The Boy and the Heron (2023).

Hamill's video game voice roles include Detective Mosely in Gabriel Knight: Sins of the Fathers; Assistant Director Wilson in Soldier of Fortune II: Double Helix; Adrian Ripburger in the LucasArts game Full Throttle; Wolverine in X2: Wolverine's Revenge (the game which accompanied the film X2); Goro Majima in Yakuza; Malefor The Dark Master in The Legend of Spyro: Dawn of the Dragon; The Watcher in Darksiders; and Master Eraqus in Kingdom Hearts Birth by Sleep and Kingdom Hearts III. Tetsuya Nomura, creator of Kingdom Hearts, describes himself as a fan of Hamill's work. There is also another character, Master Xehanort, originally voiced by Leonard Nimoy of Star Trek fame. Nomura stated that they wanted both Hamill and Nimoy for the roles, as the two characters are rivals, referencing the rivalry between fans of Star Wars and Star Trek. After Nimoy died, he was replaced by Rutger Hauer for Kingdom Hearts III, who, in turn, was replaced by Christopher Lloyd following his death for the Re Mind DLC; Lloyd had also appeared in Star Trek as Commander Kruge. Hamill narrated Call of Duty 2: Big Red One, the title of which referenced the 1980 war film he starred in. He also appeared in two installments of the Crash Bandicoot series.

Hamill is credited as the narrator in Ancient Voices (1999), a docuseries on archaeology and ancient history co-produced by the BBC and The Learning Channel, and published by Time Life as a DVD series. He also narrated the Medal of Honor and Silver Star citations of Tibor Rubin, Ralph E. Pomeroy, John Finnigan and Mitchell Red Cloud Jr. for the 2013 Korean War documentary Finnigan's War (directed by Conor Timmis).

Hamill voiced the character Todd Wainio in World War Z, a critically acclaimed audiobook based on Max Brooks' novel of the same name. He provided voices for the entire cast of the 1983 audiobook version of Pinocchio, and voiced the characters of the book series The Spiderwick Chronicles Volumes I–III, by Holly Black and Tony DiTerlizzi.

In 2007, Hamill voiced Elder Orin in the film Battle for Terra. He narrated the 2017 science-fiction TV series Dimension 404. In 2019, Hamill voiced Chucky in the Child's Play film remake, as well as the Skeksis scientist skekTek in The Dark Crystal: Age of Resistance, a ten-part Netflix prequel series to the 1982 Jim Henson film The Dark Crystal. In 2021, Hamill voiced the tailor Art Rosenbaum in the animated adaptation of Robert Kirkman's Invincible series, and Skeletor in Masters of the Universe: Revelation. He is also set to reprise the role for the follow-up to Revelation, Masters of the Universe: Revolution.

In-character as Luke Skywalker, Hamill voices the English versions of the Ukrainian air raid warning app. The alerts are not only performed in Skywalker's cadence but, after the alert is over, he signs off with "May the Force be with you". Hamill has raised funds for the Ukrainian war relief effort by signing Star Wars-themed posters to be raffled off.

At San Diego Comic-Con 2024, it was announced that Hamill would replace Brian Doyle-Murray as the voice of The Flying Dutchman in The SpongeBob Movie: Search for SquarePants. Hamill previously voiced The Moth in the SpongeBob SquarePants season 5 episode "Night Light". In September 2026, it was announced that Hamill would voice the title character in an upcoming revival of Darkwing Duck for Disney+, replacing original voice actor Jim Cummings.

==== The Joker ====
Hamill's role as the Joker began in the 1992 series Batman: The Animated Series and continued to many later spin-off series, video games and films. In the DC Animated Universe, Hamill voiced the Joker in fourteen episodes of Batman: The Animated Series, three episodes of Superman: The Animated Series, five episodes of The New Batman Adventures, five episodes of Justice League, and an episode of Static Shock. He also voiced the Joker in the 1993 theatrical film Batman: Mask of the Phantasm and the 2000 direct-to-video film Batman Beyond: Return of the Joker.

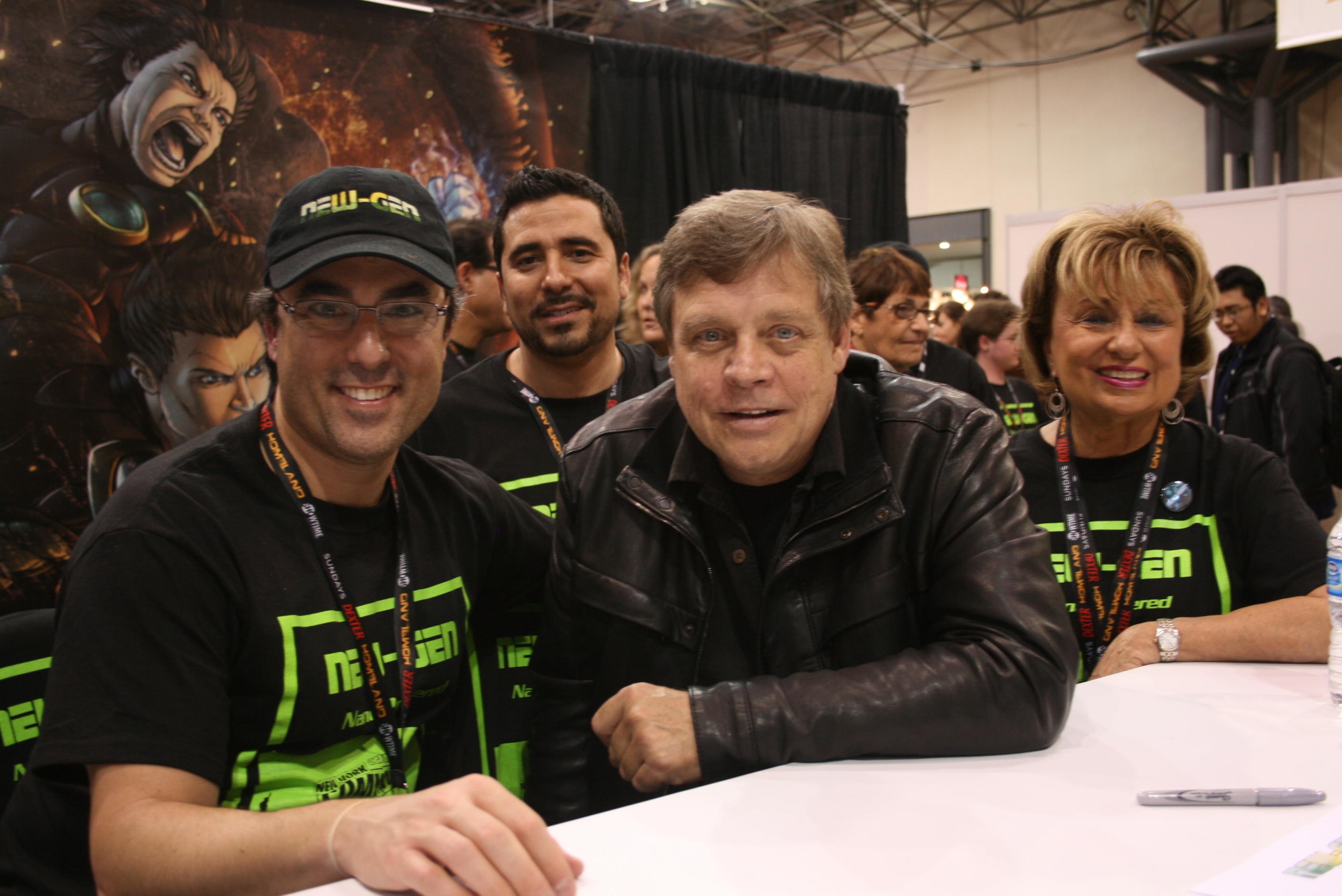
Hamill in 2011

The short-lived The WB live-action series Birds of Prey, based on the comic book of the same title, featured a flashback sequence in which the Joker shoots Barbara Gordon and paralyzes her. This sequence featured Hamill voicing Joker, dubbed over actor/stuntman Roger Stoneburner whose facial structure more resembled the character. He also voiced the character in a few segments in Robot Chicken.

Hamill voiced the Joker alongside his Batman: The Animated Series co-star Kevin Conroy as Batman and Jason Hillhouse as Dick Grayson in a feature of a storyboard scene included in the 2005 Special Edition DVD of Tim Burton's 1989 film Batman. This scene depicted the origin of Robin, which was not filmed because the producers felt it was out-of-place with the rest of the film.

Hamill has said that he has voiced the Joker for toys and amusement park rides. Although these jobs did not pay particularly well, he enjoyed even these small roles and admitted being protective of the character, preferring not to let "others sleep in my sleeping bag"; he also self-identifies as a "real comic book nerd".

Hamill has portrayed the Joker in a few Batman based video games, beginning with 2001's Batman: Vengeance, the Sega CD version of The Adventures of Batman & Robin (which was later used to create a "lost" episode of the animated series) and in Batman: Arkham Asylum. Hamill again reprised the role in the Arkham sequel, Batman: Arkham City. In May 2010, Hamill declared to IGN that his role in Arkham City would be his last as the Joker. Some months later, with the announcement of Arkham City, he clarified his statements in the interview by saying, via his Twitter account, "Only said Arkham Asylum would be hard to top, not that I was quitting." On October 19, 2011, shortly after the release of the game, Hamill announced his retirement on his Twitter account, saying "Hello/Goodbye Joker! I've enjoyed every minute behind the wheel of the Clown Prince's crazy car – I'm going to miss him more than I can say!!". In June 2012, WB Games released the expansion pack titled "The Last Laugh" for the video game DC Universe Online, featuring Hamill as the Joker. In 2015, Hamill yet again returned as the Joker in Batman: Arkham Knight with the character recurring through the game as a hallucination.

During a 2011 Comic-Con, when asked about Heath Ledger's Oscar-winning portrayal of the character in Christopher Nolan's The Dark Knight, Hamill said that it was the most original performance that he had ever seen since Anthony Hopkins' Oscar-winning portrayal of Hannibal Lecter in The Silence of the Lambs.

Hamill has commented that if there would ever be an animated version of Batman: The Killing Joke, he would gladly voice the Joker again, encouraging fans to campaign for said adaptation. On July 17, 2015, Hamill tweeted that he had his fingers crossed in hopes that he would be contacted to reprise his role as the Joker in the animated adaptation. On July 27, Collider reported that Hamill would voice the Joker in the film. The film was released in theaters for a two-day limited time. It was released on Digital HD on July 27, 2016. It was released on DVD and Blu-ray on August 2.

Hamill reprised the Joker for the animated series Justice League Action. He also reprised the Trickster for the series, as well as voicing Swamp Thing. In the animated short "Missing the Mark", Hamill voices a fictionalized version of himself, who appears alongside all three of his other characters. Hamill once again voiced Joker in Lego DC Super-Villains, replacing voice actor Christopher Corey Smith.

Hamill has been nominated for two Annie Awards for his portrayal of the character, for an Interactive Achievement Award, for a Spike Video Game Award, and has won a British Academy Games Award for Best Performer.

In January 2023, Hamill revealed in an interview that he would no longer voice the Joker following Kevin Conroy's death in 2022, stating that "Without Kevin there, there doesn't seem to be a Batman for me." Hamill's Joker appeared alongside Conroy's Batman in the crossover fighting game MultiVersus and the film Justice League: Crisis on Infinite Earths (both 2024).

=== Writing ===
Hamill is the co-writer of The Black Pearl, a comic book miniseries published by Dark Horse Comics. He wrote an introduction to the Trade Paperback Batman: Riddler Two-Face which reprints various stories involving the Riddler and Two-Face to tie in with Batman Forever. He has also written several stories for Simpsons Comics, including "Catastrophe in Substitute Springfields!", which parodies DC's Crisis on Infinite Earths and also references several other classic comics.

== Views and activism ==
=== Politics ===
==== United States ====
Hamill is an outspoken advocate of the Democratic Party, and has been a liberal for decades.

In 2005, Hamill stated that "it gives me a cold shiver down my spine" to have Luke Skywalker be compared to George W. Bush. Prior to the 2008 presidential election, Hamill urged students at Point Park University to vote for Barack Obama, describing him as "a once in a lifetime candidate". Prior to the 2012 presidential election, he referred to Mitt Romney as a "snake oil salesman", and said in an appearance on The Young Turks that Obama was like "a cross between Obi-Wan and Yoda".

Hamill endorsed P.G. Sittenfeld in the 2016 Ohio Senate election. He has been highly critical of President Donald Trump, describing his cabinet picks in 2016 as "a who's-who of really despicable people". In 2017, he criticized Trump's tweets by reading them out in his Joker voice.

During the 2020 presidential election, Hamill participated in an ad campaign for presidential candidate Joe Biden. Hamill met with President Biden at the White House in May 2024 and endorsed Kamala Harris in the 2024 presidential election. He told The Sunday Times in 2025 that he considered moving to London or Ireland after Trump won the 2024 election. He said his wife "didn't respond right away but a week later she said, 'I'm surprised you would allow him to force you out of your own country.' That son of a bitch, I thought. I'm not leaving."

==== International ====
During the 2022 Brazilian general election, Hamill expressed support for Workers' Party candidate Lula.

During the 2024 London mayoral election, Hamill expressed support for Labour Party politician Sadiq Khan as Mayor of London, describing him as "a driving force in cleaning up London's air" and sharing his love for London as a city he spent years living in.

=== Russo-Ukrainian war ===
On September 29, 2022, Hamill became an ambassador of the United24 fundraising platform, which raises funds to support Ukraine in the Russo-Ukrainian war.

In March 2023, Hamill expressed support for Ukraine, saying, "A fairy tale about good versus evil is resonant with what's going on in Ukraine". As a further show of support, Hamill lent his voice to the app Air Alert, that warns about Russian air attacks against Ukraine. On March 25, 2023, a drawing was held for posters signed by Hamill; it raised more than $300,000 for RQ-35 Heidrun reconnaissance drones.

=== Israeli–Palestinian conflict ===
In October 2023, Hamill, along with over 700 other Hollywood professionals, signed an open letter by pro-Israel group Creative Community for Peace (CCFP) condemning the Palestinian militant group Hamas, asking for the release of hostages held in the Gaza Strip, and expressing support for Israel in the Gaza war. In April 2024, Hamill said he "fully support[ed]" Gaza and Palestine while still condemning Hamas.

=== LGBTQ rights ===
Hamill has expressed support for the transgender community. In December 2019, he apologized for liking a tweet by J. K. Rowling in which she expressed support for gender-critical activist Maya Forstater, saying, "Ignorance is no excuse, but I liked the tweet without understanding what the last line or hashtags meant. It was the first four lines I liked and I didn't realize it had any transphobic connotation." In 2023, Hamill again apologized for liking a tweet by Rowling directed at transgender broadcaster India Willoughby.

In March 2022, Hamill tweeted the word "gay" 69 times together with a rainbow emoji in response to the "Don't Say Gay" bill passed in Florida.

== Personal life ==
On January 11, 1977, before shooting one of his scenes in Star Wars, Hamill was in a car accident in which he fractured his nose and left cheekbone. As a result, a double was used for the landspeeder pickup shots.

Hamill was also an early fan of David Letterman, having occasionally appeared on Late Night with David Letterman, as well as taping every episode and keeping a journal documenting the show. After encountering writer Chris Elliott, Hamill was asked for assistance in helping determine the 1,000th Viewer Mail that Letterman had answered. His practice continued to Letterman's new show on CBS, but eventually stopped.

In January 2025, Hamill and his wife evacuated their home in Malibu, California, due to the Palisades Fire. Hamill later moved to a rented house in Los Feliz.

=== Relationships and family ===
According to a 1981 profile in People, Hamill's "first serious love" was actress Anne Wyndham, cast as his sister on General Hospital, with whom he had an offscreen relationship. He would later describe experiencing seasons of on-set awkwardness while working with her after their relationship ended. In a 2017 interview, he attributed his long, happy marriage to a non-actor to learning, through his relationship with Wyndham, the dangers of being in a relationship with a fellow actor.

On December 17, 1978, Hamill married dental hygienist Marilou York in a private civil ceremony. They have three children: Nathan Elias, Griffin Tobias, and Chelsea Elizabeth. Nathan was born during the production of The Empire Strikes Back and had a cameo appearance as one of the Royal Guards of Naboo in Star Wars: Episode I – The Phantom Menace. Chelsea made a photographic appearance as an infant Axel Walker in the 1990 television series The Flash; the same photograph was used in the 2014 series. All three have cameos as Resistance soldiers in The Last Jedi. In addition to his three children, Hamill has a granddaughter through his oldest son Nathan.

== Written works ==
=== Forewords ===
- Hamill, Mark (2003). Foreword. Animation on DVD: The Ultimate Guide. By Mangels, Andy. Stone Bridge Press. ISBN 978-1-880656-68-6.

=== Comics ===
Year	Title	Notes
1996–1997	The Black Pearl	Written with Eric Johnson
September 2001	Simpsons Comics: Bart Simpson's Treehouse of Horror No. 7	"Catastrophe in Substitute Springfields!" written with Bongo Comics

== Awards and nominations ==
Year	Association	Category	Work	Result
1978	Saturn Awards	Best Actor	Star Wars	Nominated
1981	Saturn Awards	Best Actor	The Empire Strikes Back	Won
1984	Saturn Awards	Best Actor	Return of the Jedi	Won
1985	Drama Desk Awards	Outstanding Actor in a Musical	Harrigan 'N Hart	Nominated
1988	CableACE Awards	Actor in a Dramatic Series	Alfred Hitchcock Presents	Nominated
1994	Annie Awards	Voice Acting in a Television Production	Batman: The Animated Series	Nominated
2001	Annie Awards	Voice Acting in a Feature Production	Batman Beyond: Return of the Joker	Nominated
2001	DVD Exclusive Awards	Best Animated Character Performance	Batman Beyond: Return of the Joker	Won
2004	Inkpot Award	Lifetime Achievement	Himself	Honored
2010	Interactive Achievement Awards	Outstanding Achievement in Character Performance	Batman: Arkham Asylum	Won
2012	Spike Video Game Awards	Best Performance by a Human Male	Batman: Arkham City	Nominated
2012	British Academy Games Awards	Best Performer	Batman: Arkham City	Won
2014	Annie Awards	Voice Acting in a Television Production	Regular Show	Nominated
2015	Daytime Emmy Awards	Outstanding Performer in an Animated Program	Star Wars: The Clone Wars	Nominated
2015	The Game Awards	Best Performance	Batman: Arkham Knight	Nominated
2016	British Academy Games Awards	Best Performer	Batman: Arkham Knight	Nominated
2017	Disney Legends	Film	Film works	Inducted
2018	Hollywood Walk of Fame	Motion pictures star	Film works	Inducted
2018	Saturn Awards	Best Actor	Star Wars: The Last Jedi	Won
2018	Teen Choice Awards	Choice Fantasy Movie Actor	Star Wars: The Last Jedi	Nominated
2018	Teen Choice Awards	Choice Twit	Himself (Twitter)	Nominated
2019	Daytime Emmy Awards	Outstanding Performer in an Animated Program	Kulipari: Dream Walker	Nominated
2020	Saturn Awards	Best Guest Starring Performance on Television	What We Do in the Shadows	Nominated
2021	Daytime Emmy Awards	Outstanding Performer in a Preschool Animated Program	Elena of Avalor	Won
2022	Children's and Family Emmy Awards	Outstanding Voice Performance in an Animated Program	Masters of the Universe: Revelation	Nominated
2024	Astra TV Awards	Best Actor in a Limited Series or Television Movie	The Fall of the House of Usher	Nominated
2025	Saturn Awards	Best Guest Starring Role on Television	The Fall of the House of Usher	Won
2025	San Diego International Film Festival	Gregory Peck Award	Lifetime achievement	Honored
2025	Newport Beach Film Festival	Icon	Life's work	Honored
2025	Savannah Film Festival	Lifetime Achievement Award		Honored

== See also ==
- Asteroid 110026 Hamill

== Print sources ==
- Cooper, Christopher; Wilkins, Jonathan, eds. (2025). Star Wars: The Force Awakens The 10th Anniversary Special Edition (Hardback) (1st ed.). London: Titan Magazines. ISBN 9781787746732.
- Daniels, Anthony (2019). I Am C-3PO: The Inside Story (Hardback ed.). DK. ISBN 9780241357606.
- Rinzler, J.W (2007). The Making of Star Wars. Ebury Press. ISBN 9780091920142.
- Rinzler, J.W (2010). The Making of The Empire Strikes Back. Aurum. ISBN 9781845135553.
- Rinzler, J.W. (2013). The Making of Return of the Jedi. Aurum. ISBN 9781781310762.
- Wilkins, Jonathan, ed. (2017). Star Wars: A New Hope: The Official Celebration Special (Hardback ed.). Titan Magazines. ISBN 9781785864605.
- Wilkins, Jonathan, ed. (2019). Star Wars: Aliens, Creatures and Droids (Paperback) (1st ed.). London: Titan. ISBN 9781785851964.
- Wilkins, Jonathan, ed. (2021). Star Wars: The Empire Strikes Back: The 40th Anniversary Special Edition (Hardback ed.). Titan Magazines. ISBN 9781787734234.
