= Barry Minkow =

American businessman, fraudster, and convicted felon

- Born: Barry Jay Minkow; March 22, 1966 (age 60); Inglewood, California, U.S.
- Occupations: Carpet-cleaning company owner, fraud investigator, pastor
- Status: 1988: Released in 1995; 2011: Released June 6, 2019
- Convictions: December 14, 1988; 2011: Pleaded guilty on March 30; 2014: Pleaded guilty on January 22
- Criminal charges: 1988: Racketeering, securities fraud, embezzlement, money laundering, mail fraud, tax evasion, bank fraud, credit card fraud 2011: conspiracy to commit securities fraud 2014: Conspiracy to commit bank fraud, wire fraud, mail fraud and to defraud the United States
- Penalty: 1988: 25 years in federal prison, five years' probation, $26 million in restitution 2011: Five years in federal prison, $583.5 million in restitution 2014: Five years in federal prison, $3.4 million in restitution

Barry Jay Minkow (born March 22, 1966) is a former American businessman, pastor, and a repeat convicted felon. While still in high school, Minkow founded ZZZZ Best (/ˈziːbɛst/), which appeared to be an immensely successful carpet-cleaning and restoration company. However, it was actually a front to attract investment for a massive Ponzi scheme. ZZZZ Best collapsed in 1987, costing investors and lenders $100 million in one of the largest investment frauds ever perpetrated by a single person, as well as one of the largest accounting frauds in history. The scheme is often used as a case study of accounting fraud.

After being released from jail, Minkow became a pastor and self-proclaimed fraud investigator in San Diego, and spoke at churches and schools about ethics. This came to an end in 2011, when he admitted to helping deliberately drive down the stock price of homebuilder Lennar and was sentenced to five years in prison. Three years later, Minkow admitted to defrauding his own church and was sentenced to an additional five years. He is subject to restitution requirements for his many crimes totaling $612 million.

== Beginnings of ZZZZ Best ==
Barry Minkow was born in Inglewood, California and was raised in the Reseda area of the San Fernando Valley in a Jewish family. When he was nine years old, his mother got him a job as a telemarketer with the carpet-cleaning business where she worked. At the age of 16, while a sophomore at Cleveland High School, Minkow started ZZZZ Best (/ˈziːbɛst/) in his parents' garage with three employees and four phones. In the early days, he had to rely on friends to drive him to carpet-cleaning jobs since he did not have a driver's license.

At first, Minkow struggled to meet basic expenses. Two banks closed his business account because California law of the time did not allow minors to sign binding contracts, including checks. He was also plagued by customer complaints and demands for payment from suppliers. At times, he found it difficult even to make payroll. Faced with a shortage of operating capital, Minkow financed his business via check kiting, stealing and selling his grandmother's jewelry, staging break-ins at his offices, and running up fraudulent credit card charges.

Soon after, Minkow branched into the "insurance restoration" business. With the help of Tom Padgett, a claims adjuster, Minkow forged numerous documents claiming that ZZZZ Best was involved in several restoration projects for Padgett's company. Padgett and Minkow formed a fake company, Interstate Appraisal Services, that verified the details of these restorations to Minkow's bankers. Flush with loans from these banks, Minkow expanded ZZZZ Best across Southern California.

While most Ponzi schemes are based on non-existent businesses, ZZZZ Best's carpet-cleaning division was very real and won high marks for its quality. However, its insurance restoration division, which eventually accounted for 86% of company revenues, was fraudulent. Minkow raised money by factoring his accounts receivable for work under contract, as well as floating funds through several banks in an elaborate check kiting scheme.

After graduating from high school in 1985, Minkow devoted all of his time to ZZZZ Best. Short of cash despite the recent expansion, he got a loan from Jack Catain, a Los Angeles businessman who had ties to organized crime. Catain later sued Minkow for not paying him his share of the company's profits, but Minkow claimed Catain was a usurer. The suit was still working its way through the courts at the time of Catain's death in 1987. Other organized crime figures turned up as Minkow's advisers, which unnerved his employees. For instance, a major shareholder, Maurice Rind, had been convicted of securities fraud in 1976. Minkow was also a business partner with Robert Viggiano, a convicted jewel thief and reputed loanshark.

== Going public ==
At the suggestion of a friend, Minkow took his company public in January 1986, garnering a spot on NASDAQ. The accountant who audited ZZZZ Best before it went public did not visit the insurance restoration sites himself. Had he done so, he would have discovered they were mailboxes located throughout the San Fernando Valley. Minkow retained a fifty-three percent controlling interest in ZZZZ Best, making him an instant millionaire on paper. Going public seemingly offered him a way to cover up his fraudulent activities. Under securities law at the time, he had to retain his personal shares for two years. He planned to sell a million shares to the public in January 1988, believing this would give him enough money to pay everyone off and go completely legitimate.

In order to obtain more financing, Minkow was persuaded to raise $15 million of capital through an initial public offering of ZZZZ Best stock. When accountants wanted to inspect the company's operations, he borrowed fake offices for a tour of "Interstate Appraisal Services" and used an incomplete building to present a fake restoration job. Mark Morze, ZZZZ Best's financial consultant, tricked the accountants sent to perform the necessary due diligence by faking thousands of documents. The public offering closed in December and Minkow became the youngest person to lead a company through an IPO in American financial history.

Minkow launched a massive television advertising campaign portraying ZZZZ Best as a carpet cleaner that Southern Californians could trust. He owned a Ferrari and a BMW, and bought a mansion in the wealthy Valley community of Woodland Hills. He had ambitions of making the company "the General Motors of the carpet-cleaning industry."

ZZZZ Best's chief financial officer, Charles Arrington, was accused of running up $91,000 in fraudulent charges against customers of his florist business. When the Feshbach brothers, a pair of short-sellers, learned that Minkow still stood behind Arrington, they did further investigating and discovered ZZZZ Best's claimed $7 million contract to clean carpets in Sacramento was likely a fraud. This prompted the Feshbachs to short ZZZZ Best's stock, anticipating that it would fall. Additionally, none of the company's four outside directors had any experience running a public company.

== Downfall ==
By February 1987, ZZZZ Best was trading at $18 a share on NASDAQ, valuing the company at $280 million. Minkow's stake was worth $100 million. The company now had 1,030 employees with offices in California, Arizona and Nevada.

Despite its growth, the company was still facing severe cash flow shortages from paying investors for the non-existent restoration projects. Minkow believed he'd found a solution when he learned that KeyServ, the authorized carpet cleaner for Sears, was being sold by its British parent. He began merger talks with KeyServ, as the cash infusion would solve ZZZZ Best's immediate cash flow issues. Additionally, Minkow thought that KeyServ's Sears business would give ZZZZ Best enough cash to end the Ponzi scheme sooner than originally planned. Drexel Burnham Lambert offered to finance the deal with a private placement of junk bonds.

Although KeyServ was twice ZZZZ Best's size, the two companies agreed to a $25 million deal in which ZZZZ Best would be the surviving company. The merger would have made ZZZZ Best Sears' authorized carpet cleaner, and also would have made Minkow the president and chairman of the board of the largest independent carpet-cleaning company in the U.S. Soon after the KeyServ deal was announced, Minkow began making plans to become even more powerful, planning to raise $700–800 million to buy ServiceMaster in a hostile takeover and intending to expand to the United Kingdom. Outside of carpet cleaning, he had begun preliminary discussions to buy Major League Baseball's Seattle Mariners.

Just as the KeyServ merger was about to close, the credit card fraud that helped keep ZZZZ Best afloat in the early years proved to be Minkow's undoing. Minkow had blamed the fraudulent charges on unscrupulous contractors and another employee, and paid back most of the victims. However, he had not paid back a homemaker who had been overcharged a few hundred dollars. When he ignored her requests to pay her back, she tracked down several other people who had been defrauded by Minkow and gave a diary of her findings to the Los Angeles Times. The Times then wrote a story revealing that Minkow had run up $72,000 in fraudulent credit card charges in 1984 and 1985. The story, which ran just days before the merger was to close, sent ZZZZ Best stock plunging 28 percent.

Within hours of the story's publication, ZZZZ Best's banks either called their loans or threatened to do so. Drexel postponed closing until it could investigate further. Later that day, at a press conference, a reporter revealed evidence that the Sacramento carpet-cleaning project didn't exist. More seriously, she'd discovered that ZZZZ Best did not have the contractor's license required for large-scale restoration work. To calm nervous investors, Minkow issued a press release touting record profits and revenues but did so without notifying Ernst & Whinney (now part of Ernst & Young), the firm responsible for auditing the company prior to the KeyServ deal. The press release also implied that Drexel had cleared ZZZZ Best of any wrongdoing, briefly stopping the decline. However, Drexel abruptly pulled out of the deal a few days later, causing the stock price to fall again. Drexel's withdrawal stopped the deal four to seven days before it was due to close.

The day after this press release, Ernst & Whinney discovered that Minkow had written several checks to support the validity of the non-existent contracts. Many of them had been written to an associate who later told Ernst & Whinney officials about the fraud. Minkow denied knowing the man, but shortly after the checks were discovered, Ernst & Whinney discovered that Minkow had cut two checks to that same associate for an unrelated matter. When Minkow could not explain the checks, Ernst & Whinney resigned as ZZZZ Best's auditor. However, it did not inform the Securities and Exchange Commission (SEC) of its suspicions until a month later.

On July 2, 1987, Minkow abruptly resigned from ZZZZ Best for "health reasons". By this time, his company's stock had fallen to $3.50 a share—an 81 percent drop from its high in February. Minkow later revealed that on June 27, six days earlier, an independent law firm the company had retained to investigate the allegations asked for the addresses of all of the company's restoration jobs. Minkow knew that those projects did not exist. Realizing he and ZZZZ Best were finished, he decided to resign. Later, he reportedly told a member of his board that the insurance restoration business had been a sham from the very beginning.

ZZZZ Best's new board conducted an internal investigation that largely substantiated the fraud allegations. On July 6 it sued Minkow, alleging that he had absconded with $23 million in company funds. ZZZZ Best claimed that its assets had been drained to the point that it was forced into Chapter 11 bankruptcy. Two days later, the Los Angeles Police Department raided ZZZZ Best's headquarters and Minkow's home, and found evidence that the company was being used to launder drug profits for organized crime.

== Conviction and prison ==
Minkow and ten other ZZZZ Best insiders were indicted by a federal grand jury in January 1988 on fifty-four counts of racketeering, securities fraud, money laundering, embezzlement, mail fraud, tax evasion and bank fraud. The indictment accused Minkow of milking banks and investors of millions of dollars while systematically draining his company of assets. It also accused Minkow of setting up dummy companies, writing phony invoices and conducting tours of purported restoration sites. Prosecutors estimated that as much as ninety percent of the company's revenue was fraudulent. On June 16, prosecutors won a superseding indictment charging Minkow with credit card fraud and two additional counts of mail fraud.

While Minkow admitted to manipulating the company's stock, he claimed that he was forced to turn the company into a Ponzi scheme under pressure from the organized-crime figures who secretly controlled his company, a story he later admitted was false. On December 14, he was found guilty on all charges. On March 27, 1989, he was sentenced to twenty-five years in prison. He was also placed on five years' probation and ordered to pay $26 million in restitution. In sentencing him, U.S. District Court Judge Dickran Tevrizian described Minkow as a man without a conscience, rejecting his plea for a lighter sentence as "a joke" and "a slap on the wrist" for someone who had manipulated the financial system. The SEC subsequently banned him from ever serving as an officer or director of a public company again. He served under seven and a half years, most of them at Federal Correctional Institution, Englewood.

While imprisoned, Minkow claimed to have become a born-again Christian. During his prison stay, he became involved in Christian ministry, completing coursework through Liberty University's School of Lifelong Learning.

== Release ==
After his early release from prison in 1995, Minkow went to work as a pastor at the Church at Rocky Peak in Chatsworth, California, and became director of the church's Bible Institute. That same year he wrote a first-hand account of the ZZZZ Best scam, Clean Sweep. Minkow's book claims all of his share of the book's proceeds would go toward repaying his victims. His other substantial debt is a $7 million loan from Union Bank.

In 1997, Minkow became pastor of Community Bible Church in San Diego. Soon after his arrival, a church member asked him to look into a money management firm in nearby Orange County. Suspecting something was amiss, Minkow alerted federal authorities, who discovered the firm was a $300 million pyramid scheme. This was the beginning of the Fraud Discovery Institute (FDI), Minkow's for-profit investigative firm. His original targets were penny stock companies, which are often havens for fraud. However, he soon attracted the attention of media outlets including The Wall Street Journal, Bloomberg News, Fox News, and CBS's 60 Minutes. Several Wall Street investors sent money to Minkow in order to persuade him to pursue bigger targets. Minkow claimed to have uncovered $1 billion worth of fraud through the FDI.

== Shorting stock ==
Minkow's motives were brought into question by multiple news stories, which concluded that Minkow was shorting stock before he released a report on a public company. According to The San Diego Union-Tribune, Minkow had engaged in this practice as early as 2006. His critics denounced this practice as unethical, if not illegal. At least one critic accused him of engaging in short and distort, a form of securities fraud which is a reversal of a pump and dump scheme.

Minkow almost always held a position in securities on which he reported. However, he has since stated that while his lawyers advised him this practice was legal, it was probably unethical. Several companies have since sued Minkow for making false accusations against them, with most of the suits being settled out of court.

=== Herbalife Nutrition ===
For instance, Minkow accused Herbalife of a "laundry list" of issues and had "correctly revealed that Herbalife's president had inflated his résumé." Herbalife paid Minkow $300,000, after which he issued a press release withdrawing all accusations and contentions against the company, and removed all the accusations from his website. Additionally, Minkow made $50,000 from shorting Herbalife stock. He continued to profit from his short sales position due to sharp decreases in the reported company's stock price immediately after releasing a new report.

=== USANA ===
On 20 February 2007, Minkow distributed a 500-page report to officials at the SEC, the Federal Bureau of Investigation (FBI), and the Internal Revenue Service (IRS), accusing USANA of operating an illegal pyramid scheme. On the day Minkow's report was released, USANA's shares had traded at $61.19 but by August the share price had tumbled to less than $35. Minkow later acknowledged that he was shorting USANA's shares, hoping to profit from a drop in the stock price. USANA filed lawsuits against Minkow, accusing him of stock manipulation and defamation. However, USANA dropped the defamation suit and a judge later threw out four of the five claims brought against Minkow, ruling that the claims violated California's anti-SLAPP law for suing Minkow for fair criticism. The judge also cited two examples where USANA failed to refute Minkow's claims that their products were overpriced and of no better quality than other lower-priced brands. The remaining charge of stock manipulation was settled in July 2008 when USANA and Minkow reached an undisclosed settlement, which included the removal of all USANA-related materials from the FDI website, a related Chinese website, and from YouTube. Minkow also agreed to never trade in USANA's stock again. Separately from the settlement, USANA paid $142,510 in attorney fees to Minkow and the FDI under an order from federal Magistrate Samuel Alba. Court documents show that USANA never pursued others whom they suspected of being part of the alleged stock manipulation nor did they ask for an injunction, their only avenue of release in this case.

== Lennar ==
In 2009, Minkow issued a report accusing major homebuilder Lennar of massive fraud, claiming that irregularities in the company's off-balance-sheet debt accounting were evidence of a massive Ponzi scheme. Minkow accused Lennar of not disclosing enough information about this to its shareholders, and also claimed a Lennar executive had taken out a fraudulent personal loan. In an accompanying YouTube video, he denounced Lennar as "a financial crime in progress" and "a corporate bully". Lennar's stock plummeted in the wake of Minkow's reports, tumbling from $11.57 a share to $6.55 in two weeks. Minkow issued the report after being contacted by Nicholas Marsch, a San Diego developer who had filed two lawsuits against Lennar for fraud. Indeed, the language of the FDI report echoed that used in Marsch's filings. One of Marsch's suits was summarily thrown out; the other ended with Marsch having to pay Lennar $12 million in counterclaims.

Lennar responded by adding Minkow as a defendant in a lawsuit against Marsch. Minkow was initially unconcerned, since he had prevailed before in similar cases on free speech grounds. According to court records, Minkow had shorted Lennar stock, buying $20,000 worth of options in a bet that the stock would fall. Even more seriously, he also bought Lennar stock after his FDI report, believing the stock would rebound after its dramatic plunge. Minkow initially denied doing this, only to be forced to recant when confronted with trading records. Minkow forged documents alleging misconduct on Lennar's part and lied about having to go to the emergency room on the night before he was first scheduled to testify. He also went forward with the report even after a private investigator he had hired for the case could not substantiate Marsch's claims. In an unrelated development, it was also revealed that Minkow operated the FDI out of the offices of his church and even used church money to fund the organization—something which could have jeopardized his church's tax-exempt status.

On December 27, 2010, Florida Circuit Court Judge Gill Freeman issued a default judgment against Minkow in response to a motion by Lennar. Freeman found that Minkow had repeatedly lied under oath, destroyed or withheld evidence, concealed witnesses, deliberately tried to "cover up his misconduct", and had even lied to his own lawyers about his behavior. Freeman determined that Minkow had perpetrated "a fraud on the court" that was so egregious that letting the case go any further would be a disservice to justice. In her view, "no remedy short of default" was appropriate for Minkow's lies. She ordered Minkow to reimburse Lennar for the legal expenses it incurred while ferreting out his lies. Legal experts maintain that terminating sanctions such as default judgments are rare, since they are reserved for particularly egregious misconduct and have the effect of revoking a litigant's right to defend himself. Earlier, Freeman had been so angered by Minkow's behavior that she called him a liar in open court, a rarity for a judge. Lennar estimated that its attorneys and investigators spent hundreds of millions of dollars exposing Minkow's lies.

== Insider trading guilty plea ==
On March 16, 2011, Minkow announced through his attorney that he was pleading guilty to one count of insider trading. According to his lawyer, Minkow had bought his Lennar options using "nonpublic information". The plea, which was separate from the civil suit, came a month after Minkow learned he was the subject of a criminal investigation. On the same day, Minkow resigned as senior pastor of Community Bible Church, saying in a letter to his congregants that since he was no longer "above reproach", he felt that he was "no longer qualified to be a pastor." Six weeks earlier, $50,000 in cash and checks had been stolen from the church during a burglary. Though unsolved, it was noted as suspicious due to Minkow's admitted history of staging burglaries to collect insurance money.

The nature of the "nonpublic information" became clear a week later, when federal prosecutors in Miami filed a criminal information charging Minkow with one count of conspiracy to commit securities fraud. Prosecutors charged that Minkow and Marsch (listed as an unindicted co-conspirator in the complaint) conspired to extort money from Lennar by driving down its stock. The complaint also revealed that Minkow had sent his allegations to the SEC, the FBI, and the IRS, and that the three agencies found his claims credible enough to open a formal criminal investigation into Lennar's practices. Minkow then used confidential knowledge of that investigation to short Lennar stock, even though he knew he was barred from doing so. Minkow opted to plead guilty to the conspiracy charge rather than face charges of securities fraud and market manipulation, which could have sent him to prison for life.

On March 30, 2011, Minkow pleaded guilty before Judge Patricia A. Seitz. His attorney, Alvin Entin, admitted that his client had acted recklessly, but had been "deluded and taken advantage of" by Marsch. He faced a maximum of five years in prison, as much as $350,000 in fines and penalties and $500 million in restitution. However, he agreed to cooperate with the government in its probe of Marsch.

The Los Angeles Times obtained a copy of the plea agreement, in which Minkow admitted to issuing his FDI report on Lennar at Marsch's behest. According to the agreement, Marsch offered to have Minkow retract his report if Lennar paid him in cash and stock. It also said that Minkow's report triggered a bear raid which temporarily reduced the market capitalization of Lennar by $583 million. Minkow faced a minimum of thirty years in prison had the case gone to trial. On June 16, Freeman ordered Minkow to pay Lennar $584 million in damages—roughly the amount the company lost as a result of the bear raid orchestrated by Minkow and Marsch. Her ruling stated that Minkow and Marsch had entered into a conspiracy to wreck Lennar's stock in November 2008. With interest, the bill could easily approach a billion dollars—far more than Minkow stole in the ZZZZ Best scam.

On July 6, it emerged that officials with Community Bible Church had accused Minkow of running the FDI with church funds, applying for credit cards in the names of church members and leading his flock into bad investments. Church officials had made the claims as part of a confidential pre-sentencing report. When Entin got word of the letter, he asked for and was granted two weeks to review the allegations and respond to them. This pushed Minkow's sentencing back to July 21. This was the second time Minkow's sentencing had been postponed; it was originally slated for June 16 but was postponed to July 6.

In a pre-sentencing evaluation performed on May 10, 2011, Minkow was diagnosed by a Michael Brannon as having a personality disorder with antisocial and narcissistic features, attention deficit hyperactivity disorder, anxiety disorder, opioid dependence, anabolic steroid abuse, and migraine headaches.

On July 21, Seitz sentenced Minkow to five years in prison. In imposing the sentence, she stated that Minkow had "no moral compass that says 'Stop.'" Seitz also ordered him to pay Lennar $583.5 million in restitution—an amount that had been imposed a month earlier in the civil case. She also recommended that Minkow serve his sentence at Federal Prison Camp, Montgomery in Montgomery, Alabama. However, on September 20, he was ordered to begin his sentence at Federal Medical Center, Lexington in Lexington, Kentucky.

== Church fraud guilty plea ==
On June 14, 2011; KGTV in San Diego interviewed several members of Minkow's former church, who said Minkow swindled them. One woman said Minkow asked her for $300,000, purportedly to help finance a movie about his redemption story.

On January 22, 2014, Minkow pleaded guilty to one count each of conspiracy to commit bank fraud, wire fraud, mail fraud and to defraud the federal government. He admitted to embezzling over $3 million in donations to Community Bible Church from 2001 to 2011. He opened unauthorized bank accounts purportedly on the church's behalf, forged signatures on church checks, diverted money from legitimate church accounts for his personal use, and charged unauthorized personal expenses on church credit cards. He also concealed $890,000 of income and $250,000 in taxes from the IRS. Among his victims were a widower who gave $75,000 to fund a supposed hospital in Sudan to honor his wife after she died of cancer, and a woman who gave Minkow $300,000 that would have otherwise gone to help raise her teenage granddaughter.

On April 28, 2014, Judge Michael Anello sentenced Minkow to five years in prison, the maximum possible sentence under his plea bargain. The sentence ran consecutively with his earlier sentence for securities fraud. While Minkow's attorneys asked for a sentence of forty-one months, Anello felt obligated to impose the maximum for what he called a "despicable, inexcusable crime." On June 2, Minkow reached an agreement with federal prosecutors that called for him to pay $3.4 million in restitution. This will potentially be a ruinous amount for Minkow, on top of the restitution he still owes Lennar, Union Bank and the ZZZZ Best victims. Earlier, he said that the $26 million restitution for the ZZZZ Best scam alone was large enough that he would be writing restitution checks to the victims for the rest of his life. As a result of his latest sentence, Minkow was released on June 6, 2019.

== Film adaptation and docuseries ==
Prior to his 2011 conviction, production began on a film detailing Minkow's life and redemption. The film, featuring Mark Hamill, Justin Baldoni, Talia Shire and Ving Rhames, was partially funded by donations Minkow solicited from his congregation. Minkow insisted on playing the middle-aged version of himself in the film. Following his arrest, the film's release was cancelled and work began on a new ending. The film—retitled Con Man from the original title Minkow—was eventually released in March 2018.

In January 2022, a three-part Discovery+ docuseries, called King of the Con, was released. The series explored how Minkow could reinvent himself and get rich several different times. The miniseries was produced by The Content Group, with Pamela Deutsch serving as executive producer for Discovery+, and has Minkow himself recounting his past, his crimes and the process of reinventing himself.
