= Quinwood, West Virginia =

- Town
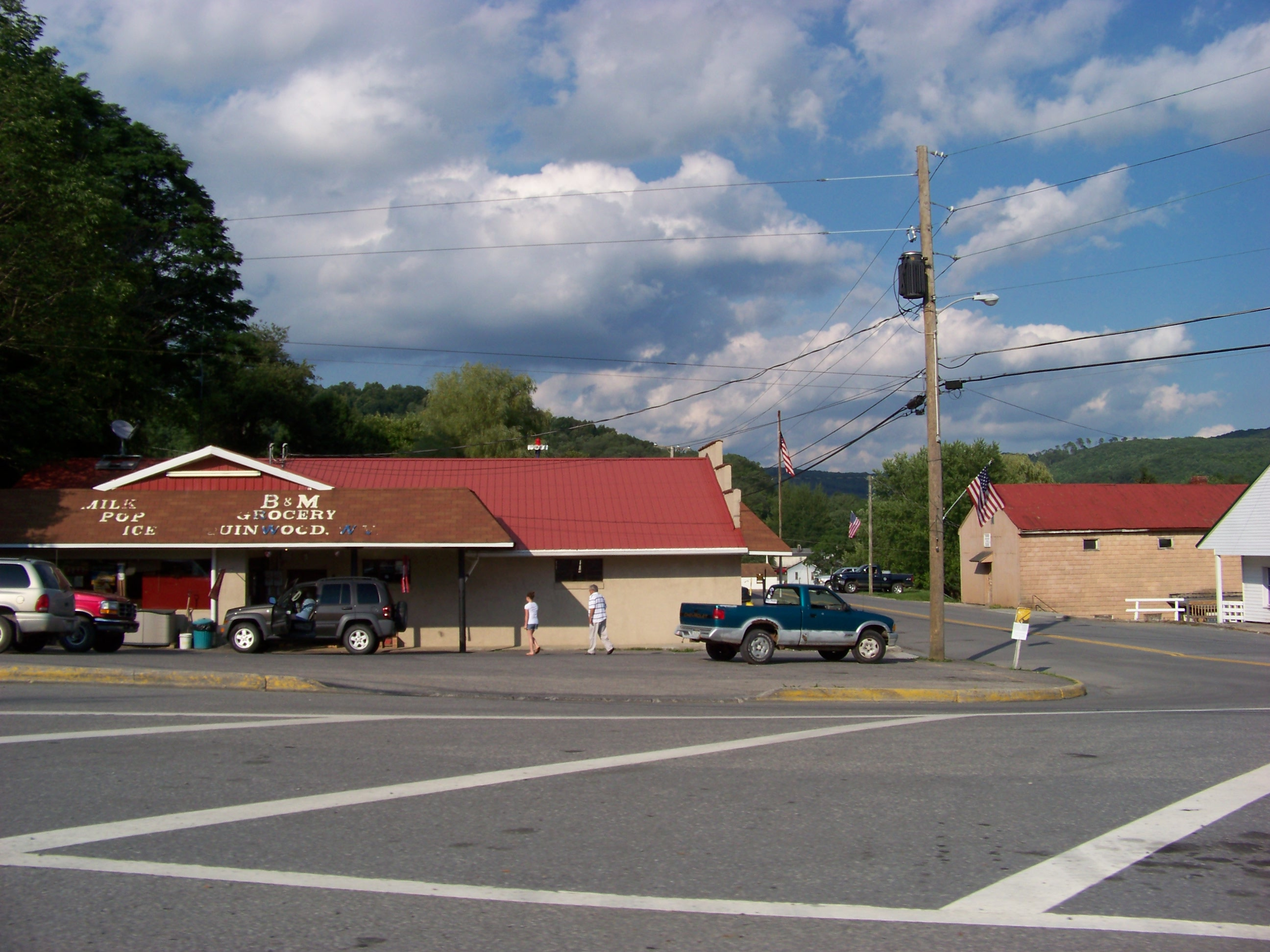
- B&M Grocery, central Quinwood

- Location of Quinwood in Greenbrier County, West Virginia.
- Coordinates: 38°03′31″N 80°42′21″W
- Country: United States
- State: West Virginia
- County: Greenbrier

Area
  - Total: 0.35 sq mi (0.90 km^{2})
  - Land: 0.35 sq mi (0.90 km^{2})
  - Water: 0 sq mi (0.00 km^{2})
- Elevation: 3,048 ft (929 m)

Population (2020)
  - Total: 222
  - Estimate (2021): 217
  - Density: 761.1/sq mi (293.85/km^{2})
- Time zone: UTC-5 (Eastern (EST))
  - Summer (DST): UTC-4 (EDT)
- ZIP code: 25981
- Area code: 304
- FIPS code: 54-66412
- GNIS feature ID: 2391380
- Website: https://townofquinwood.com/

Quinwood is a town and former coal town in Greenbrier County, West Virginia, United States. The population was 220 at the 2020 census.

The community's name is an amalgamation of the names of its proprietors Quin Morton and W. S. Wood.

== Geography ==
Quinwood is located at 38°3′29″N 80°42′16″W (38.058117, -80.704334).

According to the United States Census Bureau, the town has a total area of 0.35 square miles (0.91 km^{2}), all land.

== Demographics ==
Historical population
| Census | Pop. | Note | %± |
|---|---|---|---|
| 1950 | 838 | | — |
| 1960 | 506 | | −39.6% |
| 1970 | 370 | | −26.9% |
| 1980 | 460 | | 24.3% |
| 1990 | 559 | | 21.5% |
| 2000 | 435 | | −22.2% |
| 2010 | 290 | | −33.3% |
| 2020 | 222 | | −23.4% |
| 2021 (est.) | 217 | ▼ | −2.3% |
U.S. Decennial Census

=== 2010 census ===
At the 2010 census there were 290 people, 118 households, and 92 families living in the town. The population density was 828.6 inhabitants per square mile (319.9/km^{2}). There were 152 housing units at an average density of 434.3 per square mile (167.7/km^{2}). The racial makeup of the town was 95.5% White, 1.0% African American, 0.7% Native American, 0.3% from other races, and 2.4% from two or more races. Hispanic or Latino of any race were 0.3%.

Of the 118 households 31.4% had children under the age of 18 living with them, 58.5% were married couples living together, 15.3% had a female householder with no husband present, 4.2% had a male householder with no wife present, and 22.0% were non-families. 17.8% of households were one person and 6.7% were one person aged 65 or older. The average household size was 2.46 and the average family size was 2.66.

The median age in the town was 47 years. 18.3% of residents were under the age of 18; 8.2% were between the ages of 18 and 24; 21.5% were from 25 to 44; 32.5% were from 45 to 64; and 19.7% were 65 or older. The gender makeup of the town was 52.4% male and 47.6% female.

=== 2000 census ===
At the 2000 census there were 435 people, 169 households, and 126 families living in the town. The population density was 883.1 inhabitants per square mile (342.8/km^{2}). There were 193 housing units at an average density of 391.8 per square mile (152.1/km^{2}). The racial makeup of the town was 95.40% White, 2.53% African American, 0.23% Native American, and 1.84% from two or more races. Hispanic or Latino of any race were 0.92%.

Of the 169 households 33.1% had children under the age of 18 living with them, 59.8% were married couples living together, 11.8% had a female householder with no husband present, and 24.9% were non-families. 21.3% of households were one person and 9.5% were one person aged 65 or older. The average household size was 2.57 and the average family size was 2.98.

The age distribution was 23.9% under the age of 18, 7.6% from 18 to 24, 26.2% from 25 to 44, 23.2% from 45 to 64, and 19.1% 65 or older. The median age was 40 years. For every 100 females, there were 92.5 males. For every 100 females age 18 and over, there were 89.1 males.

The median household income was $21,705 and the median family income was $24,196. Males had a median income of $25,179 versus $19,250 for females. The per capita income for the town was $11,911. About 22.9% of families and 26.9% of the population were below the poverty line, including 41.0% of those under age 18 and 18.2% of those age 65 or over.

== Climate ==
With the elevation and location on a western facing slope, Quinwood can easily see significant amounts of snowfall when winds from the northwest carry moisture from the great lakes and ride up the mountains. This event is called orographic lift. Snowfall amounts over one foot are very common during these events. In 2012, Hurricane Sandy left 29 inches (74 cm) of snow in Quinwood.

Quinwood has a humid continental climate (Köppen Dfb), bordering on a subtropical highland climate (Köppen Cfb). Due to its higher elevation, Quinwood experiences harsher winters and milder summers in comparison to the nearby cities of Lewisburg and White Sulpher Springs.

Climate data for Quinwood, West Virginia, 1991–2020 normals, extremes 1989–present: 3319ft (1012m)
| Month | Jan | Feb | Mar | Apr | May | Jun | Jul | Aug | Sep | Oct | Nov | Dec | Year |
|---|---|---|---|---|---|---|---|---|---|---|---|---|---|
| Record high °F (°C) | 67 (19) | 71 (22) | 81 (27) | 83 (28) | 89 (32) | 88 (31) | 94 (34) | 91 (33) | 89 (32) | 86 (30) | 76 (24) | 70 (21) | 94 (34) |
| Mean maximum °F (°C) | 56.0 (13.3) | 59.6 (15.3) | 68.8 (20.4) | 78.3 (25.7) | 81.9 (27.7) | 83.1 (28.4) | 84.9 (29.4) | 84.5 (29.2) | 82.7 (28.2) | 76.3 (24.6) | 67.7 (19.8) | 56.7 (13.7) | 86.4 (30.2) |
| Mean daily maximum °F (°C) | 34.2 (1.2) | 37.8 (3.2) | 46.4 (8.0) | 58.7 (14.8) | 67.1 (19.5) | 73.1 (22.8) | 76.6 (24.8) | 75.9 (24.4) | 70.5 (21.4) | 60.0 (15.6) | 47.8 (8.8) | 38.1 (3.4) | 57.2 (14.0) |
| Daily mean °F (°C) | 26.4 (−3.1) | 29.2 (−1.6) | 37.4 (3.0) | 48.4 (9.1) | 56.9 (13.8) | 63.8 (17.7) | 67.3 (19.6) | 66.6 (19.2) | 60.9 (16.1) | 50.1 (10.1) | 39.2 (4.0) | 30.7 (−0.7) | 48.1 (8.9) |
| Mean daily minimum °F (°C) | 18.6 (−7.4) | 20.6 (−6.3) | 28.3 (−2.1) | 38.0 (3.3) | 46.8 (8.2) | 54.5 (12.5) | 58.1 (14.5) | 57.4 (14.1) | 51.3 (10.7) | 40.2 (4.6) | 30.5 (−0.8) | 23.3 (−4.8) | 39.0 (3.9) |
| Mean minimum °F (°C) | −2.3 (−19.1) | 1.8 (−16.8) | 8.0 (−13.3) | 19.6 (−6.9) | 31.3 (−0.4) | 42.8 (6.0) | 48.9 (9.4) | 47.6 (8.7) | 37.0 (2.8) | 24.2 (−4.3) | 12.9 (−10.6) | 5.4 (−14.8) | −5.9 (−21.1) |
| Record low °F (°C) | −25 (−32) | −14 (−26) | −3 (−19) | 9 (−13) | 21 (−6) | 33 (1) | 44 (7) | 38 (3) | 27 (−3) | 15 (−9) | 0 (−18) | −12 (−24) | −25 (−32) |
| Average precipitation inches (mm) | 4.09 (104) | 4.02 (102) | 5.09 (129) | 4.43 (113) | 5.58 (142) | 4.78 (121) | 5.41 (137) | 4.18 (106) | 3.92 (100) | 3.14 (80) | 3.98 (101) | 4.72 (120) | 53.34 (1,355) |
| Average snowfall inches (cm) | 22.3 (57) | 24.3 (62) | 17.5 (44) | 4.2 (11) | 0.0 (0.0) | 0.0 (0.0) | 0.0 (0.0) | 0.0 (0.0) | 0.0 (0.0) | 0.6 (1.5) | 4.5 (11) | 20.0 (51) | 93.4 (237.5) |
| Average extreme snow depth inches (cm) | 11.3 (29) | 14.0 (36) | 10.7 (27) | 2.3 (5.8) | 0.1 (0.25) | 0.0 (0.0) | 0.0 (0.0) | 0.0 (0.0) | 0.0 (0.0) | 0.5 (1.3) | 2.7 (6.9) | 8.0 (20) | 19.7 (50) |
| Average precipitation days (≥ 0.01 in) | 16.9 | 14.5 | 14.8 | 13.7 | 14.3 | 12.9 | 12.3 | 11.2 | 8.9 | 9.8 | 11.1 | 15.0 | 155.4 |
| Average snowy days (≥ 0.1 in) | 9.2 | 7.7 | 5.7 | 1.7 | 0.0 | 0.0 | 0.0 | 0.0 | 0.0 | 0.4 | 2.2 | 7.3 | 34.2 |
Source 1: NOAA
Source 2: XMACIS (snowfall, temp records & monthly max/mins)

== Notable person ==
Quinwood was the birthplace of Ralph E. Pomeroy, who received the Medal of Honor for his actions during the Korean War.
