= George Ritzer =

American sociologist (born 1940)

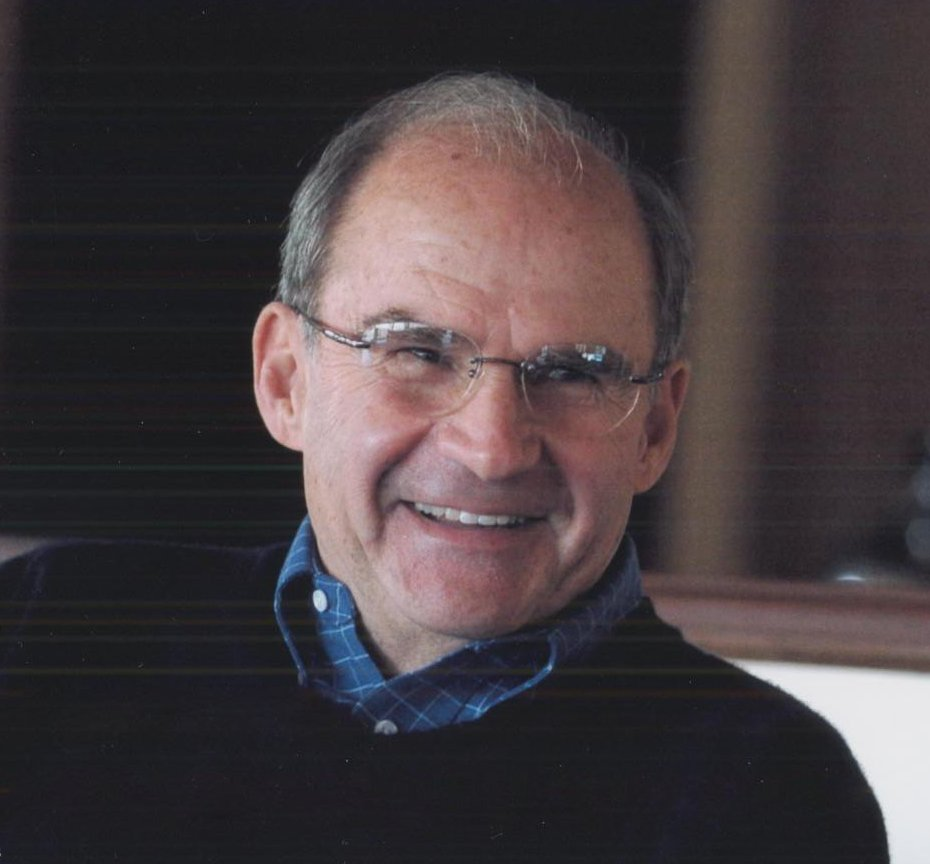
- Born: October 14, 1940 (age 85); New York City, United States

Education
- Education: City College of New York (B.A. in Psychology); University of Michigan Ann Arbor (M.B.A.); Cornell University (Ph.D. in Organizational Behavior)

Philosophical work
- Main interests: Sociology; Social theory; Metatheory; Theory of rationalization; Political sociology; Economic sociology; sociology of consumption
- Notable works: The McDonaldization of Society (1993); Sociology: A Multiple Paradigm Science (1975, 1980); Toward an Integrated Sociological Paradigm (1981); Metatheorizing in Sociology (1991); The Blackwell Companion to Major Contemporary Social Theorists (2003); The Globalization of Nothing (2007); Enchanting a Disenchanted World (2009); Globalization: A Basic Text (2010,2015, 2022); Introduction to Sociology (2012); Sociological Theory (2013); Essentials of Sociology (2014)
- Notable ideas: Created the concept of McDonaldization; consumption; something vs. nothing; prosumption; globalization; grobalization; glocalization; metatheory

George Ritzer (born October 14, 1940) is an American sociologist, professor, and author who has mainly studied globalization, metatheory, patterns of consumption, and modern/postmodern social theory. His concept of McDonaldization draws upon Max Weber's idea of rationalization through the lens of the fast food industry. He coined the term in a 1983 article for The Journal of American Culture, developing the concept in The McDonaldization of Society (1993), which is among the best selling monographs in the history of American sociology.

Ritzer has written many general sociology books, including Introduction to Sociology (2012) and Essentials to Sociology (2014), and modern/postmodern social theory textbooks. Many of his works have been translated into over 20 languages, with over a dozen translations of The McDonaldization of Society alone.

In the Spring of 1989, Ritzer was a Fellow at the Swedish Collegium for Advanced Study in Uppsala, Sweden.

Ritzer is currently a Distinguished Professor Emeritus at the University of Maryland, College Park.

In December 2025, the journal Thesis Eleven published a special issue dedicated to celebrating Ritzer’s intellectual trajectory and highlighting his influence on contemporary social theory. The volume was edited by sociologist J. Michael Ryan, a frequent collaborator and co-author of several works with Ritzer.

== Biography ==
=== Personal life ===
Ritzer was born in 1940 to a Jewish family in upper Manhattan, New York City. Ritzer's father was a taxicab driver and his mother was a secretary; he also has one brother. Ritzer described his upbringing as "upper lower class". When his father contracted what Ritzer referred to as "a strange illness," speculated to be from his job as a taxi driver, Ritzer's mother had to do so much as to break open the family's piggy bank, where they stored half dollars, to provide for the family. Living a marginal economic existence, he never felt deprived relative to others while growing up in a "working-class, multi-ethnic neighborhood".

His father never received his high school diploma and therefore, had no strong desire for Ritzer to achieve educationally. Ritzer described his father as being “a very bright man who simply grew up in a different time”. His parents in general did not push him to pursue higher education or knew much about it. Instead, it was more “’ go to college because that’s what people are doing,’ instead of that classic middle class Jewish family push to go to the elite universities’”.

In an interview, Ritzer noted a formative experience that occurred while he attended the Bronx High School of Science, he felt that he was “a pretty average kind of student” as he was among incredibly intelligent individuals. Due to his surroundings, it took him a while to realize that he “was a little bit above average.” In addition, despite the high school being largely orientated toward the sciences and his classmates sharing these interests, Ritzer had no interest in math or science.

While in high school, Ritzer had a friend who he would read the same classic novel such as Crime and Punishment with, and then walk around the city walking miles discussing the book alone. He gave this example in an interview where he was explaining the nature of his high school and the students who went there. Ritzer also noted that “it was just sort of known that if you were bright or saw yourself as bright then you wanted to go to the Bronx High School of Science” to further exemplify the environment he was in during high school.

Growing up, Ritzer was an avid sports player. He often played basketball, in large part due to his height, and other sports like baseball. He also read a lot even as he notes that he wasn’t “very academically inclined".

Ritzer and his wife, Sue (married 1963), have two children and five grandchildren. Despite being a workaholic, he has always made time for his family. Ritzer also loves to travel, oftentimes using the work trips as a time for a mini vacation with his wife.

Ritzer resides in Maryland with Sue, where he owns three homes. He noted in an interview regarding consumption how the success of his books has “allowed him to acquire things, mostly houses” and gives him the ability to live life the way he wants to. Since he likes to be outdoors, he wants homes that will allow him to do so. For example, due to the restriction of winter months in Maryland which inhibits his ability to walk outside, he purchased a place in Florida where he can continue his hobby of walking “three or four miles a day” when he’s not writing inside.

=== Education and early employment ===
Ritzer graduated from the Bronx High School of Science in 1958, stating to have "encountered the brightest people I have ever met in my life". While at Bronx High School of Science, Ritzer received a New York State Regents Scholarship which would follow him to whichever college he chose to attend.

Ritzer began his higher education at City College of New York, a free college at the time. His scholarship in addition to the free college anyway proved to be a benefit to the economic positioning of the Ritzer family. While at CCNY, Ritzer initially planned to focus on business, but he later changed his major to accounting. Ritzer stated in an interview that he was a student at CCNY when he first stepped inside a McDonalds, which greatly juxtaposed the distinct culture of restaurants and stores in New York. This event unknowingly catalyzed Ritzer's study and major theory of McDonaldization.

After graduating from CCNY in 1962, Ritzer decided that he was interested in pursuing business again. He was accepted into the M.B.A. program at the University of Michigan Ann Arbor, where he received a partial scholarship. While at Michigan, his official academic interest was human relations; however, he had many other intellectual hobbies, such as reading Russian novels. Ritzer reported that at Michigan, he was able to grow and improve as a student. However, during his time at Michigan, he remembers being heavily involved in global events occurring at the time. He reports memories of going to the Michigan Union to watch the happenings of the Cuban Missile Crisis.

After graduating from The University of Michigan in 1964, Ritzer began working in personnel management for the Ford Motor Company, however, this proved to be a negative experience for him. His managers mistakenly hired three people, more than was necessary, for the one job, leaving him idle and unoccupied. As he once said: "[i]f we had two hours of work a day, it was a lot." Nevertheless, he was always expected to appear busy. He would constantly wander around the factory for hours observing people working, causing many of the workers and foremen to become hostile towards him. Moreover, Ritzer also found problems within the management structure at Ford. Most of the younger people with advanced degrees defied their less-educated authorities. Ritzer said, "I'd like to see a society in which people are free to be creative, rather than having their creativity constrained or eliminated." This feeling of dehumanization is very relevant in his future sociological work of McDonaldization. Furthermore, he found himself constrained and unable to do anything creative while working at Ford, encouraging him to apply to Ph.D. programs.

Ritzer enrolled in Cornell University's School of Labor and Industrial Relations Ph.D. program in Organizational Behavior in 1965, ironically returning to another business program despite his distaste for his time at Ford. There, his adviser Harrison Trice suggested that he minor in sociology. After a conversation with the head of the department, Gordon Streib, Ritzer realized that he knew nothing about sociology and was then urged to read "Broom and Selznick’s Introduction to Sociology" and found himself enthralled with the subject matter. He continued to succeed in sociology courses at the graduate level. As a testament to his interest and dedication to the subject, he received an A+ on a 102-page paper he wrote for a course on American society. His professor stated that the paper was "too long not to be good". This experience as well as out-reading the other sociology students in a small seminar with Margaret Cussler allowed Ritzer to become more confident as a sociology student due to his ability to outwork the competition. He attributed his talent of being able to compete with well-read and experienced sociology students to his work ethic.

Ritzer never earned a degree in sociology but studied psychology and business. He began his sociological work writing theory connecting his minimal sociological education alongside the experiences that struck him when first experiencing the McDonalds chain stores. As he said in a later interview, "I basically trained myself as a social theorist, and so I had to learn it all as I went." Despite this challenge, Ritzer found that not being trained in social theory was advantageous for him, because his reasoning was not limited to a particular theoretical perspective.

=== Academic awards ===
- Honorary Doctorate from La Trobe University, Melbourne, Australia
- Honorary Patron, University Philosophical Society, Trinity College, Dublin
- American Sociological Association's Distinguished Contribution to Teaching Award
- 2012–2013 Robin William Lectureship from the Eastern Sociological Society

=== McDonaldization ===
George Ritzer wrote The McDonaldization of Society.

Ritzer's idea of McDonaldization is an extension of Max Weber's (1864–1920) classical theory of the rationalization of modern society and culture. Weber famously used the terminology "iron cage" to describe the stultifying, Kafkaesque effects of bureaucratized life, and Ritzer applied this idea to an influential social system in the twenty-first century: McDonald's. Ritzer argues that McDonald's restaurants have become the better example of current forms of instrumental rationality and its ultimately irrational and harmful consequences on people. Ritzer shared similar views with Weber about rationalization. While Weber claims that “the most sublime values have retreated from public life”, Ritzer claims that even our food is subject to rationalization, whether it is “the McDonaldized experience or the steak dinner that is subjected to the fact that it contains 2,000 calories and 100 grams of fat."”Ritzer identifies four rationalizing dimensions of McDonald's that contribute to the process of McDonaldization, claiming that McDonald's aims to increase:

1. Efficiency: McDonald's delivers products quickly and easily without inputting an excessive amount of money. The "McDonald's model," and therefore the McDonald's operations, follow a predesigned process that leads to a specified end, using productive means. The efficiency of the McDonald's model has infiltrated other modern-day services such as completing tax forms online, easy weight loss programs, The Walt Disney Company FASTPASSes, and online dating services, eHarmony and match.com.
2. Calculability: America has grown to connect the quantity of a product with the quality of a product and that "bigger is better". The "McDonald's model" is influential in this conception due to providing a lot of food for not that much money. While the end products feed into the connection between the quantity and quality of the product, so does the McDonald's production process. Throughout the food production, everything is standardized and highly calculated: the size of the beef patty, the number of french fries per order, and the time spent in a franchise. The high calculability of the McDonald's franchise also extends over into academics. It is thought that the academic experience, in high school and higher education, can be quantified into one number, the GPA. Also, calculability leads to the idea that the longer the resume or list of degrees, the better the candidate, during an application process. In addition to academics being affected by the McDonaldization in society, sports, most specifically basketball, have also been affected. It used to be that basketball was a more laid-back, slow-paced sort of game, yet through the creation of fast-food and McDonald's, a shot clock was added to increase not only the speed of the game but also the number of points scored.
3. Predictability: Related to calculability, customers know what to expect from a given producer of goods or services. For example, customers know that every Big Mac from McDonald's is going to be the same as the next one; there is an anticipated predictability to the menu as well as the overall experience. To maintain the predictability for each franchise, there has to be "discipline, order, systematization, formalization, routine, consistency, and a methodical operation". The predictability of the McDonald's franchise also appears through the golden arches in front of every franchise as well as the scripts that the employees use on the customers. The Walt Disney Company also has regulations in place, like dress codes for men and women, in order to add to the predictability of each amusement park or Disney operation. Predictability has also extended into movie sequels and TV shows. With each movie sequel, like Spy Kids 4, or TV show, Law & Order and its spinoffs, the plot is predictable and usually follow a preconceived model.
4. Control: McDonald's restaurants pioneered the idea of highly specialized tasks for all employees to ensure that all human workers are operating at exactly the same level. This is a way to keep a complicated system running smoothly; rules and regulations that make efficiency, calculability, and predictability possible. Oftentimes, the use of non-human technology, such as computers, is used. The McDonald's food is already "pre-prepared", the potatoes are already cut and processed, just needing to be fried and heated, and the food preparation process is monitored and tracked. The computers tell the managers how many hamburgers are needed at the lunchtime rush and other peak times and the size and shape of the pickles as well as how many go on a hamburger is managed and controlled. The control aspect of McDonaldization has extended to other businesses, Sylvan Learning and phone operating systems, and even birth and death. Every step of the learning process at Sylvan, the U-shaped tables and instruction manuals, is controlled as well as each step of the birthing process, in modern-day hospitals, and the process of dying.

McDonaldization is profitable, desirable, and at the cutting edge of technological advances. Many "McDonald's" aspects of society are beneficial to the advancement and enhancement of human life. Some claim that rationalization leads to "more egalitarian" societies. For example, supermarkets and large grocery stores offer variety and availability unlike smaller farmer's markets from generations past. The McDonaldization of society also allows operations to be more productive, improve the quality of some products, and produce services and products at lower cost. The Internet has provided countless new services to people that were previously impossible, such as checking bank statements without having to go to a bank or being able to purchase things online without leaving the house. These things are all positive effects of the rationalization and McDonaldization of society.

However, McDonaldization also alienates people and creates a disenchantment of the world. The increased standardization of society dehumanizes people and institutions. The "assembly line" feel of fast-food restaurants is transcending many other facets of life and removing humanity from previously human experiences. Through implementing machines and computers in society, humans can start to "behave like machines" and therefore "become replaced by machines".

The McDonaldization of Society has been translated into over a dozen languages.

=== Consumption ===
Karl Marx was one of the first to establish a field of sociological theory surrounding consumption and its flaws. Consumption refers to the participation in purchasing and absorbing the products of capitalist society, as well as their effect. The topic of consumption in sociology has skyrocketed since Marx's time, primarily in Europe from the mid-late 1900s. Since, consumption has become a basis of study within the science. An early admirer of Jean Baudrillard’s Consumer Society (1970), Ritzer is a leading proponent of the study of consumption. In addition to his beliefs expressed in The McDonaldization of Society, the most important sources for Ritzer’s sociology of consumption are his edited Explorations in the Sociology of Consumption: Fast Food Restaurants, Credit Cards and Casinos (2001), Enchanting a Disenchanted World: Revolutionizing the Means of Consumption (2nd edition 2005, 3rd edition 2009), and Expressing America: A Critique of the Global Credit-Card Society (1995). Ritzer is also a founding editor, with Don Slater, of Sage's Journal of Consumer Culture.

=== Prosumption ===
First coined by Alvin Toffler in 1980, the term prosumption is used by Ritzer and Jurgenson, to break down the false dichotomy between production and consumption and describe the dual identity of economic activities. Ritzer argues that prosumption is the primordial form of economic activities, and the current ideal separation between production and consumption is aberrant and distorted due to the effect of both Industrial Revolution and post-WWII American consumption boom. It has only recently become popularly acknowledged that the existence of prosumption as activities on the internet and Web 2.0 resemble prosumption much more so than production or consumption individually. Various online activities require the input of consumers such as Wikipedia entries, Facebook profiles, Twitter, Blog, Myspace, Amazon preferences, eBay auctions, Second Life, etc. Ritzer argues that we should view all economic activities on a continuum of prosumption with prosumption as production (p-a-p) and prosumption as consumption (p-a-c) on each pole.

=== Something vs. Nothing ===
According to Ritzer, "Something" is a locally conceived and controlled social form that is comparatively rich in distinctive substantive content. It also describes things as being fairly unusual. "Nothing" is "a social form that is generally centrally conceived, controlled and comparatively devoid of distinctive substantive content" "Nothing" usually aims at the standardized and homogenous, while "something" refers to things that are personal or have local flavor. Examples of "nothing" are McDonald's, Wal-Mart, Starbucks, credit cards, and the Internet. Examples of "something" are local sandwich shops, local hardware stores, family arts and crafts places, or a local breakfast cafe. Ritzer believes that things that embody the "nothing" component of this dichotomy are taking over and pushing "something" out of society. He explains the advantages and disadvantages of both "something" and "nothing" in The McDonaldization of Society.

=== Globalization ===
In Ritzer's research, globalization refers to the rapidly increasing worldwide integration and interdependence of societies and cultures. This book presents a sophisticated argument about the nature of globalization in terms of the consumption of goods and services. He defines it as involving a worldwide diffusion of practices, relations, and forms of social organization and the growth of global consciousness. The concept of "something" vs. "nothing" plays a large part in understanding Ritzer's Globalization. Society is becoming bombarded with "nothing" and Ritzer seems to believe that the globalization of "nothing" is almost unstoppable Ritzer's aforementioned The Globalization of Nothing (2004/2007) stakes out a provocative perspective in the ongoing and voluminous globalization discourse. For Ritzer, globalization typically leads to consumption of vast quantities of serial social forms that have been centrally conceived and controlled – one McDonald's hamburger, i.e., one instance of nothing again and again- dominates social life (Ritzer, George. 2004. The Globalization of Nothing. Thousand Oaks, CA: Pine Forge Press). To better understand globalization, it can be broken down into a few characteristics:

- The beginning of global communication through different media like television and the Internet
- The formation of a "global consciousness"

In addition to The Globalization of Nothing, Ritzer has edited The Blackwell Companion to Globalization (2007), written Globalization: A Basic Text (2009), and edited an Encyclopedia of Globalization (forthcoming). Insight into Ritzer's distinctive approach to globalization is available via a special review symposium in the Sage journal Thesis Eleven (Number 76, February 2004).

=== Grobalization ===
In his book The Globalization of Nothing (2004), Ritzer quotes that globalization consists of glocalization and grobalization. Grobalization, a term coined by Ritzer himself, refers to "imperialistic ambitions of nations, corporations, organizations, and the like and their desire, indeed need, to impose themselves on various geographic areas". As opposite to glocalization, grobalization aims to "overwhelm local". Its ultimate goal is to see profit grow through unilateral homogenization, thus earning its name grobalization. Capitalism, Americanization, and McDonaldization are all parts of grobalization.

Grobalization involves three motor forces: capitalism, McDonaldization, and Americanization. Grobalization creates a world where:

1. Things are more homogenous and ubiquitous.
2. Larger forces overwhelm the power of people to adapt and innovate in ways that preserve their autonomy.
3. Social processes are coercive, determining the nature of local communities, which have little room to maneuver.
4. Consumer goods and the media are key forces that largely dictate the nature of the self and the groups a person joins.

Ritzer provides American textbook as an example of grobalization. In his book, The Globalization of Nothing, he quotes that textbooks are "oriented to rationalizing, McDonaldizing, the communication of information." Students, rather than evaluating the competing ideas, instead absorb the information given to them. Yet, these textbooks are surprisingly sold out worldwide, only to be slightly revised to reflect local standards.

=== Glocalization ===
Glocalization is a combination of the words "globalization" and "localization" used to describe a product or service that is developed and distributed globally, but is also fashioned to accommodate the user or consumer in a local market, causing the products, or results of glocalization, to vary depending on different locations. The term emphasizes global heterogeneity and rejects the notion that the norms and behaviors in West are leading to cultural homogeneity. The local individuals are able to manipulate their own situation in the world and become creative agents in what products and services are represented in their local environment within the glocalized world. Ritzer further explains Glocalization as a relatively benign process that is closest to the "something" end of things. It creates variety and heterogeneity within society. Ritzer has written about this term in his own works, demonstrating its connection to globalization and "something vs. nothing".

=== Metatheory ===
Metatheory can be defined as the attainment of a deeper understanding of theory, the creation of new theory, and the creation of an overarching theoretical perspective. There are three types of metatheorizing: M_{u}, M_{p}, and M_{o}. Through the application of the three subsets of metatheory, Ritzer argues that the field of sociology can create a stronger foundation, experience "rapid and dramatic growth", and generally increase not only the knowledge of metatheory but social theory in general.

The first category of metatheory (M_{u}), aims at being a means of attaining a deeper understanding of theory. Within the greater category of M_{u}, Ritzer establishes four other subsets: internal-intellectual, internal-social, external-intellectual, and external-social. The internal-intellectual sector of M_{u} identifies the "schools of thought" and the structure of current sociologists and social theories. The internal-social subtype identifies connections between sociologists and connections between sociologists and society. The last two subsets of M_{u} are looking more at the macrolevel of sociology than the other two subsets. The third subtype of M_{u} is the external-intellectual view of sociology; it looks at different studies and their concepts, tools, and ideas in order to apply these aspects to sociology. The fourth, and final, subset is external-social where the impact of social theory in a larger societal setting is studied.

The second (M_{p}), aims at being a prelude to theory development. New social theory is created due to the complex study and interpretation of other sociologists. For example, Karl Marx's theories are based on Hegel's theories. The theories of the American sociologist, Talcott Parsons, are based on the theories of Émile Durkheim, Max Weber, Vilfredo Pareto, and Alfred Marshall.

The last (M_{o}), aims at being a source of perspectives that overarch sociological theory. Influenced by Thomas Kuhn’s The Structure of Scientific Revolutions (1962), Ritzer has long advocated the view that social theory is improved by systematic, comparative and reflexive attention to implicit conceptual structures and oft-hidden assumptions.

Key works include Sociology: A Multiple Paradigm Science (1975), Toward an Integrated Sociological Paradigm (1981), Metatheorizing in Sociology (1991), and Explorations in Social Theory: From Metatheorizing to Rationalization (2001). See also Ritzer’s edited Metatheorizing (1992).

=== Modern and postmodern social theory ===
Ritzer is known to generations of students as the author of numerous comprehensive introductions and compendia in social theory. Postmodern society is a consumer society that invents new means of consumption, such as credit cards, shopping malls, and shopping networks. Today, "Capitalism needs us to keep on spending at ever-increasing levels to be and remain capitalism." As with several of Ritzer's other principal works, many are translated into languages as diverse as Chinese, Russian, Persian, Hebrew and Portuguese. Key volumes in this genre include The Sociological Theory (7th edition 2008), Classical Sociological Theory (5th edition 2008), and Modern Sociological Theory (7th edition 2008), Encyclopedia of Social Theory (2 vols. 2005), and Postmodern Social Theory (1997). For convenient access to many of Ritzer's substantive contributions to modern and postmodern social theorizing, see Explorations in Social Theory: From Metatheorizing to Rationalization (2001) as well as more recent work often co-authored with his many students, such as (with J. Michael Ryan) "Postmodern Social Theory and Sociology: On Symbolic Exchange with a ‘Dead’ Theory," in Reconstructing Postmodernism: Critical Debates (2007).

== Works ==
Ritzer has published many monographs and textbooks. He has edited three encyclopedias, including the Blackwell Encyclopedia of Sociology. He has written approximately one hundred scholarly articles in respected journals.

=== Sociology: A Multiple Paradigm Science (1975, 1980) ===
Based on his original article appearing in the American Sociologist, this book provides a foundation for Ritzer's other works on metatheory. The piece applies Thomas Kuhn's idea of scientific paradigms to sociology and demonstrating that sociology is a science consisting of multiple paradigms. Ritzer also discusses what implications this has for the field of sociology.

=== Toward an Integrated Sociological Paradigm (1981) ===
In this book, Ritzer contends that sociology needs an integrated paradigm in order to add to the extant paradigms noted in Sociology: A Multiple Paradigm Science. Ritzer proposes an integrated paradigm dealing with the interrelationships between the many levels of social reality.

=== Metatheorizing in Sociology (1991) ===
This paper describes and makes the case for sociological metatheorizing, or the systematic study of sociological theory. Three types of metatheorizing are delineated on the basis of their end products: the attainment of a deeper understanding of theory, the creation of new theory, and the creation of an overarching theoretical perspective (a metatheory). The basic problems in metatheorizing are reviewed and it is concluded that the most basic difficulty has been the lack of a clear definition of the subfield. Some thoughts on the future of metatheorizing in sociology are offered.

=== The McDonaldization of Society (1993) ===
In this provocative book, George Ritzer explores how Weber's classic thoughts on rationalization take on new vitality and meaning when applied to the process of McDonaldization. He describes this as the process by which the principles of the fast food restaurants are coming to dominate more and more sectors of society in the United States as well as the rest of the world. George Ritzer is most well known for The McDonaldization of Society, which has five different editions and has sold over 175,000 copies as of 2007.

Ritzer shows how Weber's central characteristics of rationalized systems - efficiency, predictability, calculability, substitution of non-human for human technology and control over uncertainty - have found widespread expression in a broad range of organized human activity, including travel, consumer products and services, education, leisure, politics and religion as well as in the fast food industry.

=== The Blackwell Companion to Major Contemporary Social Theorists (2003) ===
Guide to thirteen leading social theorists: Robert K. Merton, Erving Goffman, Richard M. Emerson, James Coleman, Harold Garfinkel, Daniel Bell, Norbert Elias, Michel Foucault, Jürgen Habermas, Anthony Giddens, Pierre Bourdieu, Jean Baudrillard, Judith Butler. During the Introduction of this book, Ritzer writes, “Although any list of theorists covered in a collection such as this one can be read as an official cannon, this book is intended to be used as ‘cannon fodder’ in an open, contestable process of theory construction and reconstruction."

=== The Globalization of Nothing, Second Edition (2007) ===
The Globalization of Nothing, Second Edition emphasizes the processes of globalization and how they relate to McDonaldization. As before, this book is structured around four sets of concepts addressing the issues of: "places/non-places," "things/non-things," "people/non-people," and "services/non-services." By drawing upon salient examples from everyday life, Ritzer invites the reader to examine the nuances of these concepts in conjunction with the paradoxes within the process of the globalization of nothing. Critical questions are raised throughout, and the reader is compelled not only to seek answers to these questions, but also to critically evaluate the questions as well as their answers. The current edition features a greater emphasis on the main topic of globalization: a new first chapter offers an introductory overview of globalization and globalization theory, outlining the unique ways in which these topics are addressed throughout the text. It also delves into two subprocesses of globalization — "glocalization" and "grobalization."

=== Enchanting a Disenchanted World, Third Edition (2009) ===
Enchanting a Disenchanted World, Third Edition examines Disney, malls, cruise lines, Las Vegas, the World Wide Web, McDonald's, Planet Hollywood, credit cards, and all the other ways we now consume. The current edition was updated to reflect the recent economic recession and the impact of the internet. Ritzer continues to explore this book's central thesis: that our society has undergone fundamental change because of the way and the level at which we consume. The third edition demonstrates how we have created new "cathedrals" of consumption (places that enchant us so as to entice us to stay longer and consume more) while continuing to take capitalism to a new level. These places of consumption, whether in our homes, the mall, or cyberspace, are in a constant state of "enchanting the disenchanted," luring us through new spectacles because their rational qualities are both necessary and deadening at the same time. The book also includes a wide range of theoretical perspectives — Marxian, Weberian, critical theory, postmodern theory — as well as a number of concepts such as hyperconsumption, implosion, simulation, and time and space to show the audience how sociological theory can be applied to everyday phenomena.

=== Globalization: A Basic Text (2010) ===
The first full-scale textbook of its kind, Globalization: A Basic Text provides a balanced introduction to the major topics in globalization studies. Written in a highly accessible style, and drawing on sources both academic and popular, the book adopts a definition of globalization that emphasizes transplanetary flows and the structures that both expedite and impede those flows. Driven by a range of theories from imperialism and Americanization (and anti-Americanism), to neo-liberalism and the neo-Marxian alternatives, as well the major types of cultural theory, the book examines the key events in the history of globalization, and the principle flows and structures produced in the course of that history. Among the major topics covered are the economy, culture, technology, media and the Internet, migration, the environment, global inequalities, and the future of globalization. Making extensive use of maps and with a glossary of key terms, this book offers the reader not only a descriptive, but also acritical, analysis of globalization.

=== Introduction to Sociology (2012) ===
Introductory textbook co-written with Wendy Wiedenhoft Murphy, this piece serves to illustrate relevance of sociology to daily life for beginning sociology students. The text highlights primary sociological concepts as well as basic theory, with an emphasis on Ritzer's largest areas of study: McDonaldization, consumerism, and sociology of the digital age. The textbook is on its sixth edition as of August 2023, co-authored with J. Michael Ryan, who contributes insights from his research on gender, sexuality, and the social impacts of the COVID-19 pandemic.

=== The McDonaldization of Society: 20th Anniversary Edition (2012) ===
Ritzer's McDonaldization of Society, now celebrating its 20th anniversary, continues to stand as one of the pillars of modern-day sociological thought. By linking theory to 21st-century culture, this book resonates with audiences in a way that few other books do, opening their eyes to many current issues, especially in consumption and globalization. As in previous editions, the book has been updated and it offers new discussions of, among others, In-N-Out Burger and Pret a Manger as possible antitheses of McDonaldization. The biggest change, however, is that the book has been streamlined to offer an even clearer articulation of the McDonaldization thesis. The final chapter also looks at "The DeMcDonaldization of Society", and concludes that while it is occurring on the surface, McDonaldization is alive and well.

=== Sociological Theory, Ninth Edition (2013) ===
George Ritzer and Jeffery Stepnisky are co-authors this book. The book is split into four parts. Part One goes into specific details about the early years of sociological theory, focusing on Karl Marx, Emile Durkheim, Max Weber, and Georg Simmel. Part Two shifts into modern sociological theories, such as Structural Functionalism, Systems Theory, Conflict Theory, varieties of Neo-Marxism Theory, Symbolic Interactionism, Ethnomethodology, Exchange, Network, and Rational Choice Theories, Contemporary Feminist Theory. Part Three covers Integrative Sociological Theory, specifically Micro-Macro and Agency-Structure Integration. Part Four is focused on contemporary Theories of Modernity, Globalization Theory, Structuralism, Poststructuralism, and Postmodern Social Theory, and Social Theory in the Twenty-First Century.

=== Essentials of Sociology (2014) ===
Adaptation of Introduction to Sociology (2012), with the intention of being shorter and more streamlined. Includes same primary content (see Intro to Sociology 2012). On fourth edition as of December 2019.

=== Globalization: A Basic Text Second Edition (2015) ===
Updated to reflect recent global developments, the second edition of Globalization: A Basic Text presents an up-to-date introduction to major trends and topics relating to globalization studies.

=== Globalization: A Basic Text Third Edition (2022) ===
In the comprehensively revised Third Edition of Globalization: A Basic Text, distinguished researchers and authors George Ritzer and Paul Dean deliver an up-to-date introduction to major trends and topics related to the study of globalization. The book includes accessible and rigorous material on the key theories and major topics in globalization, as well as modern developments like the rise of populism and far-right political groups, Brexit, migration and backlash to it, trade negotiations, social media and the spread of misinformation, climate change, social justice issues, and COVID-19.

== Leadership roles ==
- 2009-2010 – First Chair of the ASA Section-in-Formation on Global and Transnational Sociology
- 2000 - American Sociological Association Distinguished Scholarly Publication

Award Committee

- 1989–1990 Chair of Section on Theoretical Sociology, ASA

Present positions: Editor, Blackwell Encyclopedia of Sociology; editor, Journal of Consumer Culture; associate editor, Journal of Tourism and Cultural Change; editorial board, Sociology Analysis; consulting editor: St. Martin Press/Worth, Series on Contemporary Social Issues; Sage of England, Series on Cultural Icons; McGraw-Hill.

== Bibliography ==
- Toward an Integrated Sociological Paradigm (1981)
- Metatheorizing in Sociology (1991)
- Metatheorizing (1992)
- Expressing America: A Critique of the Global Credit Card Society (1995)
- Explorations in Social Theory: From Metatheorizing to Rationalization (2001)
- Encyclopedia of Sociology (2007)
- The Blackwell Companion to Globalization (2007)
- Globalization: A Basic Text (2009)
- Encyclopedia of Globalization (2012)

== See also ==
- The McDonaldization of Society
- Retailtainment
- Globalization
