= McDonaldization =

Sociological concept

McDonaldization is the process of a society adopting the characteristics of a fast-food restaurant. The McWord concept was first proposed by sociologist George Ritzer in his 1983 article in the Journal of American Culture and developed in his 1993 book The McDonaldization of Society. McDonaldization is a reconceptualization of rationalization and scientific management. Where Max Weber used the model of the bureaucracy to represent the direction of this changing society, Ritzer sees the fast-food restaurant as a more representative contemporary paradigm. Critiques of the McDonaldization thesis include Ahuvia and Izberk-Bilgi's analysis of a countertrend they call eBayization, and Alexander's argument that McDonaldization is a paralysing concept and ignores more person-centred models such as cooperatives or the Toyota Production System.

== Aspects ==
Ritzer highlighted four primary components of McDonaldization, those being efficiency, calculability, predictability, and control. Aside from these four aspects, Ritzer went on to state that the strategy is rational within a narrow scope but leads to outcomes that are harmful or irrational. As these processes spread to other parts of society, modern society's new social and cultural characteristics are created. For instance, as McDonald's enters a country and consumer patterns are unified, cultural hybridization occurs.

=== Efficiency ===
Efficiency is the optimal method for accomplishing a task. In this context, Ritzer has a very specific meaning of "efficiency". In the example of McDonald's customers, it is the fastest way to get from being hungry to being full. Efficiency in McDonaldization means that every aspect of the organization is geared toward the minimization of time.

=== Calculability ===
Calculability refers to the objective being quantifiable (e.g., sales) rather than being subjective (e.g. taste). McDonaldization developed the notion that quantity equals quality, and that a large amount of product delivered to the customer in a short amount of time is the same as a high quality product. This allows people to quantify how much they are getting versus how much they are paying. Organizations want consumers to believe that they are getting a large amount of product for not a lot of money. Workers in these organizations are judged by how fast they are instead of the quality of work they do.

=== Predictability ===
Predictability refers to the prevalent standardization and uniform services. "Predictability" means that no matter where a person goes, they will receive the same service and receive the same product every time when interacting with the McDonaldized organization. This also applies to the workers in those organizations. Their tasks are highly repetitive, highly routine, and predictable.

=== Control ===
Control refers to standardized and uniform employees, and the replacement of human by non-human technologies.

== Examples ==
Junk food news, defined here as inoffensive and trivial news served up in palatable portions, is an example of McDonaldization. Another example could be McUniversities, which features modularized curricula, delivering degrees in a fast-track pick-and-mix fashion to satisfy all tastes. The diminished quality of these products can only be disguised by extensive advertising which constantly repackages them to look new.

In penology, there has been a shift from punishments and treatment tailored to individual offenders, to attempting to control classes of offenders who are considered to be at high risk of recidivism through standardized penalties, such as those specified by three-strikes laws or sentencing guidelines. Offenders are classified by security level and sent to facilities deemed capable of adequately incapacitating prisoners in their risk category. Technology such as electronic surveillance, electronic monitoring, urinalysis, and computer-based offender tracking systems are often used in place of humans in the penal system.

=== Education ===
It has been argued by a westerner that an example of the phenomenon of McDonaldization can be seen in education, where there is seen to be increasing similarity between that of Western classrooms and the rest of the world. Slater argues that the class size, layout and pedagogy in Peru closely resemble that of America, with clear examples of Western culture focused on efficiency of transfer of knowledge in other parts of the world. Furthermore, Slater goes on to demonstrate that the McDonaldization of education could have many negative side effects; particularly that it does not promote inquiry or creativity. Therefore, schools will become less effective at educating children as they will fail to develop critical and creative thinkers.

According to Wong, the influence of McDonaldization has also affected Higher Education classrooms.

- Efficiency – Computer graded exams limit the amount of time necessary for instructors to grade their students.
- Calculability – Letter Grades and Grade Point Averages are used and calculated to measure a student's success over the course of their academic career.
- Predictability – Course availability and requirements have become more standardized amongst universities, making it easier to find similar courses and content at different locations.
- Control – Courses are structured very specifically and must meet certain requirements and follow certain guidelines. Courses begin and end at the same time on the same predetermined days and last for a specific number of weeks.

A study by Carroll (2013) describes how e-learning has become one of the biggest phenomena of educational literature in recent years. Although the potential promise of e-learning is often expected within the process of learning, much of the emphasis is in fact on the electronic issues to facilitate learning, with little regard for its consequences on the learning process. Consequently, this often erodes the human factor in learning – making the learning process a more isolated experience. This article suggests that academics should become more cautious with their acceptance of facilitating learning through e-learning platforms without fully understanding the impact on students learning experiences. It also explores the changing role of students in discovering, questioning, and seeking knowledge into that of ‘consumers of pre-packed education.

The McDonaldization of Education is not only limited to physical classroom settings. It is predicted by George Ritzer that MOOCs (Massive Open Online Courses) will make future education even more McDonaldized. While it is possible to create a new original MOOC every semester, it is more likely a basic structure will be created and subsequently altered each time in order to make their creation more efficient. Over time as the interest and quality of MOOCs increases, the same pre recorded MOOCs may be used by many different universities, creating predictable content for MOOC students. Computer graded exams will be used more frequently than written essay exams to make it more efficient for the instructors. Yet since MOOCs limit the amount of contact between student and teacher, it will be difficult to engage the course on a deeper and more meaningful level.

== De-McDonaldization ==
Organizations have been making an effort to deny the rationalization of McDonaldization. Efforts are related to focusing on quality instead of quantity, enjoying the unpredictability of service and product and employing more skilled workers without any outside control. Protests have also been rising in nation-states in order to slow down the process of McDonaldization and to protect their localization and traditional value.

Some local case studies show how adjusting the rational model of McDonald's to suit local cultural preferences results in a diminution of the original McDonald's product. The more the company adjusts to local conditions, the more appeal the scientific calculations of the specifically American product may be lost. This can be used to justify McDonald's uniform approach. The ubiquity of McDonald's and the uniformity of its practices is a contributing factor to globalization.

== Response from McDonald's ==
The response from McDonald's, expressed by its representatives in the United Kingdom, is that Ritzer, like other commentators, uses the company's size and brand recognition to promote ideas that do not necessarily relate to the company's business practices.

== See also ==
- Americanization
- Cocacolonization
- Cultural globalization
- Disneyfication
- Fast Food Nation, 2001 book
- Food, Inc.
- Fordism
- Globalization
- Golden Arches Theory of Conflict Prevention
- Jihad vs. McWorld
- McWorld
- Super Size Me, 2004 documentary film
- Walmarting
