= Teenie Beanies =

Miniature Beanie Babies

The Teenie Beanies are miniature Beanie Babies that were offered as McDonald's promotions in Happy Meals from 1997 to 2000.

The Teenie Beanies were most in demand from McDonald's in the first year they were offered (1997), but demand steadily declined in popularity every year thereafter, even though more were produced each time.

During the peak of their popularity, which was in 1998, Teenie Beanies were the cause of many fights at various McDonald's locations, resulting in police calls, criminal charges, and injuries. Among these incidents included a Miami area McDonald's employee, who was charged with the theft of the toys. Though originally acquired through the purchase of a Happy Meal (and for around $2 additional charge for each release of specialty babies from 1999 onwards), they were often sold for much higher prices on the secondary market after the promotion. Some McDonald's locations exhausted their supplies of Teenie Beanies before the promotion was over. Teenie Beanies returned to McDonald's in July 2009, featuring Beanie Babies 2.0, the subseries of Ty Beanie Babies. Consumers could log onto ty.com and play online with their new Teenie Beanie as a marketing decision to raise public awareness and garner interest in the Beanie Babies 2.0 virtual pets. Originally, there was a 30-day trial period for playing with the toys online, but now the company has decided to allow consumers to keep their virtual pets for an undisclosed period of time (albeit indefinite).

An all-new line of Teenie Beanie Boos, a miniaturized version of the popular Beanie Baby spin-off with large eyes, were introduced to McDonald's in July 2014 and late May 2017. Another line, called Teenie Teeny Tys, was released in late March 2019.

== 1996 Series ==
The 1996 series included 10 Beanies.

1. Patti the Platypus
2. Pinky the Flamingo
3. Chops the Lamb
4. Chocolate the Moose
5. Goldie the Goldfish
6. Speedy the Turtle
7. Seamore the Seal
8. Snort the Bull
9. Quacks the Duck (resembling Quackers)
10. Lizz the Lizard (resembling Lizzy)

== 1998 Series ==
The 1998 series included 12 Beanies.

1. Doby the Doberman
2. Bongo the Monkey (named Mitch in European countries)
3. Twigs the Giraffe
4. Inch the Inchworm
5. Pinchers the Lobster
6. Happy the Hippo (named Percival in European countries)
7. Mel the Koala
8. Scoop the Pelican
9. Bones the Dog
10. Zip the Cat
11. Waddle the Penguin
12. Peanut the Elephant

== 1999 Series ==
The 1999 series, which consisted of 16 Beanies released from May 21 to June 3, included four bears, which were known as the International Bears One of those International Bears, Glory the Bear, was also given out (in different packaging from the one sold to customers) as an exclusive Teenie Beanie to McDonald's employees and Ty reps at the end of the promotion.

1. Freckles the Leopard
2. Antsy the Anteater (resembling Ants)
3. Smoochy the Frog
4. Spunky the Cocker Spaniel
5. Rocket the Blue Jay
6. Iggy the Iguana
7. Strut the Rooster
8. Nuts the Squirrel
9. Claude the Crab
10. Stretchy the Ostrich (resembling Stretch)
11. Nook the Husky (resembling Nanook)
12. Chip the Cat

International Bears:

- Britannia (United Kingdom)
- Erin (Ireland)
- Glory (United States)
- Maple (Canada)

== 2000 Series ==
In 2000, there were 32 different Teenie Beanies produced in all. The first 29 of them came out in the spring, and the final three, which were the Patriotic Trio of 1996, were released in the fall. Unlike in earlier years, the 2000 series was divided into several categories. One of those Beanies, Millennium the Bear, was also given out (in different packaging from the one sold to customers) as an exclusive Teenie Beanie to McDonald's employees and Ty reps at the end of the promotion.

1. Lips the Fish
2. Slither the Snake
3. Flip the Cat
4. Dotty the Dalmatian
5. Lucky the Ladybug
6. Bumble the Bee
7. Spinner the Spider
8. Flitter the Butterfly
9. Tusk the Walrus
10. Blizz the White Tiger (resembling Blizzard)
11. Spike the Rhino
12. Schweetheart the Orangutan
13. Neon the Seahorse
14. Coral the Fish
15. Sting the Stingray
16. Goochy the Jellyfish
17. Springy the Bunny
18. Bushy the Lion

Super Stars

Dinosaur Trio:

- Rex the Tyrannosaurus
- Bronty the Brontosaurus
- Steg the Stegosaurus

International Bears:

- Osito (Mexico)
- Germania (Germany)
- Spangle (United States)

Legends:

- Peanut the Royal Blue Elephant
- Chilly the Polar Bear
- Humphrey the Camel

Others:

- Millennium the Bear (McHappy Day)
- The End the Bear (End of season's promotion)

U.S.A. Trio(released in Fall 2000):

- Libearty the Bear
- Righty the Elephant
- Lefty the Donkey

== 2004 Series ==
Following a four-year hiatus, a set of Teenie Beanies was introduced in 2004. Unlike the earlier sets, the twelve that came out this time bore no resemblance to any regular Ty Beanie Babies, with the exception of the Ronald McDonald bear which was an exclusive Beanie Baby handed out to those who attended the Worldwide McDonald's Owner/Operator Convention. Rather, each one represented a different McDonald's product or character.

1. Happy Meal 25th Bear (10th in Canada)
2. Burger the Bear
3. Birdie the Bear
4. Golden Arches the Bear
5. McNuggets the Bears
6. Ronald McDonald the Bear
7. Happy Meal the Bear
8. Shake the Bear
9. Hamburglar the Bear
10. Big Red Shoe the Bear
11. Fries the Bear
12. Grimace the Bear

== 2009 Series ==
Following a five-year hiatus, the Teenie Beanies 2.0 promotion ran from July 17, 2009, through August 13, 2009. Unlike earlier sets, this release was heavily based on the Beanie Babies 2.0 line, a subseries of the original Beanie Babies that come with online virtual codes much akin to other popular toy product lines such as Webkinz. In addition, there were four Teenie Beanies which represented original Beanie Babies, some teddy bears made specifically for this promotion that do not having a matching Beanie counterpart, and some McDonaldland and McWorld characters including Ronald McDonald and Grimace. The set included 30 styles to celebrate the 30th anniversary since the advent of the Happy Meal.

1. Clipper the Dolphin
2. Maiden the Ladybug
3. Boomer the Dog (original Beanie Babies)
4. Ronald McDonald the Clown
5. Jumps the Frog
6. Woolsy the Lamb
7. Quackly the Duck
8. Aussie the Koala
9. Streamers the Bear
10. Fez the Monkey (McWorld mascot)
11. Pico the Chihuahua
12. Thirty the Bear
13. Chill the Penguin
14. Radish the Dog (McWorld mascot)
15. Fluffball the Guinea Pig
16. Topper the Giraffe
17. Rascal the Labradoodle
18. Yammy the Cat (McWorld mascot)
19. Fable the Unicorn
20. Ming the Panda
21. Grimace the Tastebud
22. Skunkers the Skunk
23. Hydrant the Dalmatian
24. Spurs the Horse (original Beanie Babies)
25. Cargo the Bulldog
26. Pops the Gorilla
27. Frostiness the Polar Bear (original Beanie Babies)
28. Oasis the Tiger
29. Splits the Flamingo
30. Celebration the Bear (known as "Happy Birthday" in the original Beanie Babies)

=== Misprints ===
Some of these toys contain a misprint where instead of saying "30 Years Of Happiness", they will say "15 Years Of Happiness". It is unknown how many were like this, but it is safe to assume a very small amount existed, compared to the total amount produced. Currently only 3 are known to be like this on the internet, though more must have existed.

== Teenie Boos (2014) ==
Following yet another five-year hiatus, the Teenie Beanie Boos were created for the 35th anniversary of the Happy Meal in 2014. They are smaller versions of the large-eyed Beanie Boos. Each is available in two color variations. Their promotion lasted from July 4 to July 31, 2014. The set includes 8 styles:

1. Coconut the Monkey
2. Glamour the Leopard
3. Magic the Unicorn
4. Spells the Owl
5. Ollie the Octopus
6. Surf the Dolphin
7. Peanut the Elephant
8. Myrtle the Turtle

== Teenie Boos (2017) ==
Teenie Boos returned in 2017 after a three-year hiatus. The promotion lasted from May to June 2017. The set includes 15 styles:

1. Bushy the Lion
2. Blizz the Bengal tiger)
3. Mel the Koala
4. Timber the Grey Wolf
5. Chocolate the Moose
6. Bongo the Monkey
7. Twigs the Giraffe
8. Seamore the Seal
9. Snort the Bull
10. Spike the Rhino
11. Peanut the Elephant
12. Frostiness the Polar Bear
13. Tusk the Walrus
14. Freckles the Cheetah
15. Waddle the Penguin

== Teeny Tys (2019) ==
Teeny Tys were released in 2019 for Happy Meal's 40th anniversary. The promotion lasted throughout April 2019. The set includes 12 styles in three color variations:

1. Mabs the Giraffe
2. Mimi the Owl
3. Rugger the Raccoon
4. Tiggy the Tiger
5. Flips the Platypus
6. Nori the Narwhal
7. Pocket the Penguin
8. Prince the Husky
9. Sami the Goldfish
10. Star the Unicorn
11. Kaleb the Koala
12. Gilda the Flamingo

== Teenie Boos (2021) ==
After another three-year hiatus, Teenie Boos were released in 2021. Their promotion lasted from May to June 2021. The set includes 14 styles:

1. Louie the Lion
2. Safari the Giraffe
3. Dotson the Black Jaguar
4. Sully the Sloth
5. Pongo the Penguin
6. Iceberg the Leopard Seal
7. Sammy the Great Horned Owl
8. Henry the Kodiak Bear
9. Kookoo the Koala
10. Kipper the Kangaroo
11. Slick the Fox
12. Glitzy the Reindeer
13. Tiggs the Tiger
14. Ming the Panda

Pongo, Louie, Kookoo and Ming were released in Singapore from February 16 to March 23, 2022.

== See also ==
- List of promotions by McDonald's
