= J. Michael Ryan (sociologist) =

American sociologist

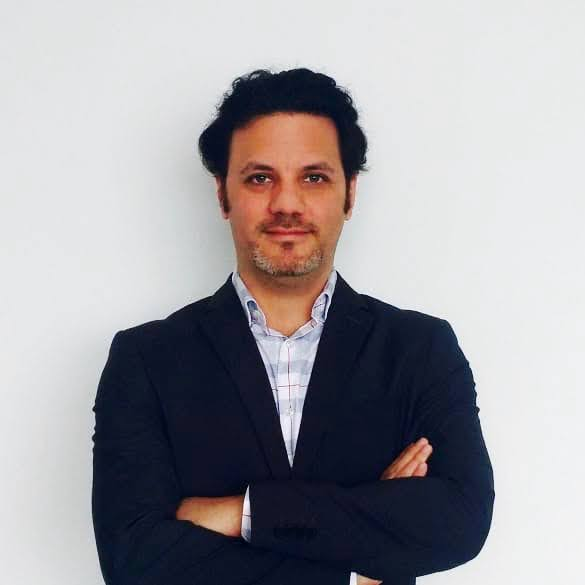
- J. Michael Ryan, 2026
- Born: John Michael Ryan; September 28, 1979 (age 47); Crawfordsville, Indiana, U.S.
- Occupations: Sociologist, academic, and editor
- Known for: Research on social theory, gender and sexuality, globalization, and the social dimensions of the COVID-19 pandemic
- Awards: Society for the Study of Social Problems Outstanding Scholarship Award (2026) Nazarbayev University Inclusive Teaching Award (2021) Choice Outstanding Academic Title (2020)

Academic background
- Education: University of Maryland, College Park (PhD)

Academic work
- Discipline: Sociology
- Sub-discipline: Social theory; gender and sexuality studies; sociology of health and global crises
- Institutions: Pontifical Catholic University of Peru University of Maryland, College Park American University in Cairo University of Lisbon Nazarbayev University
- Notable works: Introduction to Sociology (6th ed., 2023) The Wiley-Blackwell Encyclopedia of Sociology (2nd ed., 2025) COVID-19: Social Inequalities and Human Possibilities (2022)

John Michael Ryan (known professionally as J. Michael Ryan) is an American sociologist, academic, and editor recognized for his work in social theory, gender and sexuality studies, survey design, and the social dimensions of global crises, particularly the COVID-19 pandemic.

== Early life and education ==
J. Michael Ryan was born on September 28, 1979, in Crawfordsville, Indiana. He is the son of Danny Paul Ryan I, a truck driver, factory worker, and small business owner, and Marilyn Jane Ryan (Jones). He is a first-generation college student. He graduated from North Montgomery High School and earned his Ph.D. in sociology from the University of Maryland, College Park.

== Career ==
Ryan is a former student and long-term collaborator of sociologist George Ritzer, author of The McDonaldization of Society. Together they have worked on Introduction to Sociology (6th edition, 2023), a leading textbook in the discipline of sociology; and The Wiley-Blackwell Encyclopedia of Sociology (2nd edition, 2025), the largest major reference work in the history of the field. Ryan has also worked with Ritzer to advance a wide variety of other fields, including theories of globalization as well as defining the relationship between McDonaldization and artificial intelligence.

Ryan has also co-edited a number of other major reference works including The Wiley Blackwell Encyclopedia of Health, Illness, Behavior, and Society (2nd edition, 2025; with William Cockerham, Jonathan Gabe, and Stella Quah), the most comprehensive major health reference work in the social sciences, as well as The Wiley Blackwell Encyclopedia of Social Theory (2017; with Bryan Turner, Chang Kyung-Sup, Cynthia Fuchs Epstein, Peter Kivisto, and William Outhwaite), and The Wiley Blackwell Encyclopedia of Consumption and Consumer Studies (2015; with Daniel T. Cook). He also served as an Advisory Editor on The Wiley Blackwell Encyclopedia of Gender and Sexuality Studies (edited by Nancy Naples, Renée C. Hoogland, Maithree Wickramasinghe, and Wai Ching Angela Wong).

Ryan is the founding editor of the COVID-19 Pandemic Series, published by Routledge, which examines the social, political, and cultural dimensions of the pandemic. In 2022, he published COVID-19: Social Inequalities and Human Possibilities, co-authored with Serena Nanda. A recent interview with Ryan on COVID-19 as a social, economic, and political phenomenon — beyond the purely medical perspective — was included in the compilation Crisis and Contagion: Conversations on Capitalism and Covid-19 (2023), which brings together figures such as Noam Chomsky, Nancy Fraser, Mike Davis, Naomi Klein, and others. In this publication, Ryan discusses the importance of taking a syndemic approach to understanding global health issues as well as the ways in which the pandemic arguably served as a boom for neoliberal approaches to social maintenance.

Ryan's work has appeared in interdisciplinary journals such as Journal of Language and Sexuality, Journal of Gender Studies, Journal for the Scientific Study of Religion, International Review of Sociology, Postdigital Science and Education, and Thesis Eleven, among others. He has (co-)edited more than thirty-five volumes and (co-)authored more than forty-five book chapters and seventy-five encyclopedia entries. For his academic work, he has been honored as a recipient of a C. Wright Mills Fellowship at the University of Maryland. He later worked as a researcher on the TransRights Project at the University of Lisbon, which was funded by the European Research Council.

During his tenure as an Associate Service Fellow at the National Center for Health Statistics (NCHS) in Washington, D.C., Ryan led a cognitive interviewing project (together with Kristen Miller) to develop two sexual identity-related questions for the (U.S.) National Health Interview Survey: one pertaining to gender identity and one to sexual orientation. These questions were ultimately implemented and have generated improved estimates of the lesbian, gay, and bisexual population in the USA. During his tenure at NCHS, Ryan also served on a number of Obama administration executive-level, United States Department of Health and Human Services interagency advisory committees focused specifically on addressing policy gaps related to minority health, including the United States Department of Health and Human Services Office of the Secretary Transgender Issues Listening Panel and the Healthy People 2020 Federal Interagency Workgroup for LGBT Issues.

Ryan is a Research Professor at the Pontificia Universidad Catolica del Peru. Previously, he held academic positions at the University of Maryland (USA), the Facultad Latinoamericana de Ciencias Sociales (Ecuador), the American University in Cairo (Egypt), the Universidade de Lisboa (Portugal), and Nazarbayev University (Kazakhstan). Ryan is also the current Chair of the Global Division of the Society for the Study of Social Problems (2026–2028).

Scholarly impact

Ryan's editorial leadership has been characterized by an emphasis on international collaboration and thematic integration. His projects frequently assemble contributors from diverse geographic regions and theoretical traditions, reflecting an orientation toward global sociology. By organizing large-scale reference works and thematic collections, he has played a role in shaping how sociological concepts and debates are presented to new generations of scholars.

His work on encyclopedias has provided widely used academic resources that serve as entry points into specialized areas of study, while his edited volumes on contemporary issues – particularly the COVID-19 pandemic – have sought to situate urgent global events within broader sociological frameworks.

== Awards ==
- Society for the Study of Social Problems, Health, Health Policy, and Health Services Division Outstanding Scholarship Award (2026)
- Nazarbayev University Inclusive Teaching Award (2021)
- Choice Outstanding Academic Title for Gender in the Middle East and North Africa: Contemporary Issues and Challenges (2020)
