= Weber Thesis =

Weber Thesis can refer to:

- Rationalization (sociology) (Rationalisation thesis)
- The Protestant Ethic and the Spirit of Capitalism

See also

- Monopoly on violence
- Secularisation
- Max Weber
