= Jihad vs. McWorld =

1995 book by Benjamin Barber

- Cover to the paperback edition
- Author: Benjamin Barber
- Language: English
- Subject: Political science
- Publisher: Times Books
- Publication date: 1995
- Publication place: United States
- Media type: Print (hardcover)
- Pages: 381
- ISBN: 978-0-812-92350-6
- Dewey Decimal: 909.82/9 21
- LC Class: HM201 .B37 1996

Jihad vs. McWorld: How Globalism and Tribalism Are Reshaping the World is a 1995 book by American political scientist Benjamin Barber, in which he puts forth a theory that describes the struggle between "McWorld" (globalization and the corporate control of the political process) and "Jihad" (Arabic term for "struggle", here modified to mean tradition and traditional values, in the form of extreme nationalism or religious orthodoxy and theocracy). Benjamin Barber similarly questions the impact of economic globalization as well as its problems for democracy.

The book was based on a March 1992 article by Barber first published in The Atlantic Monthly. The book employs the basic critique of neoliberalism seen in Barber's earlier, seminal work Strong Democracy. As neoliberal economic theory—not to be confused with social liberalism—is the force behind globalization, this critique is relevant on a much larger scale. Unregulated market forces encounter parochial (which he calls tribal) forces.

These tribal forces come in many varieties: religious, cultural, ethnic, regional, local, etc. As globalization imposes a culture of its own on a population, the tribal forces feel threatened and react. More than just economic, the crises that arise from these confrontations often take on a sacred quality to the tribal elements; thus Barber's use of the term "Jihad". In the 2001 introduction, Barber expressed regret using "Jihad" as it became descriptive and solely applied to Semitic peoples who believe in Islam and not, as he had hoped, applied to both and every actor (nation-state) in this Clash of Civilizations ("McWorld" as well as "Jihad").

Barber's prognosis posits that neither global corporations nor traditional cultures are supportive of democracy. He further posits that McWorld could ultimately win the "struggle". He also proposes a model for small, local democratic institutions and civic engagement as the hope for an alternative to these two forces.

== Problems for democracy ==
Barber states that neither Jihad nor McWorld needs or promotes democracy.

=== McWorld ===
Barber argues that there are several imperatives that make up the McWorld, or the globalization of politics: a market imperative, a resource imperative, an information-technology imperative, and an ecological imperative. Due to globalization, our market has expanded and is vulnerable to the transnational markets where free trade, easy access to banking and exchange of currency are available. With the emergence of our markets, we have come up with international laws and treaties in order to maintain stability and efficiency in the interconnected economy. Resources are also an imperative aspect in the McWorld, where autarky seems insufficient and inefficient in presence of globalization. The information-technology of globalization has opened up communications to people all over the world, allowing us to exchange information. Also, technology is now systematically integrated into everyone's lives to the point where it "gives every person on earth access to every other person". Globalization of ecology may seem cliche; Barber argues that whatever a nation does to their own ecology, it affects everyone on Earth. For instance, cutting down a jungle will upset the overall oxygen balance, which affects our "global lungs". McWorld may promote peace and prosperity, but Barber sees this as being done at the cost of independence and identity, and notes that no more social justice or equality than necessary are needed to promote efficient economic production and consumption.

=== Jihad ===
Barber sees Jihad as offering solidarity and protecting identities, but at the potential cost of tolerance and stability. Barber describes the solidarity needed within the concept of Jihad as being secured through exclusion and war against outsiders. As a result, he argues, different forms of anti-democratization can arise through anti-democratic one-party dictatorships, military juntas, or theocratic fundamentalism. Barber also describes through modern day examples what these 'players' are. "[T]hey are cultures, not countries; parts, not wholes; sects, not religions, rebellious factions and dissenting minorities at war not just with globalism but with the traditional nation-state. Kurds, Basques, Puerto Ricans, Ossetians, East Timoreans, Quebecois, the Catholics of Northern Ireland, Catalans, Tamils, and of course, Palestinians – people with countries, inhabiting nations not their own, seeking smaller worlds within borders that will seal them off from modernity."

=== Confederal option ===
Barber writes democracy can be spread and secured through the world satisfying the needs of both the McWorld and Jihad. "With its concern for accountability, the protection of minorities, and the universal rule of law, a confederalized representative system would serve the political needs of McWorld as well as oligarchic bureaucratism or meritocratic elitism is currently doing." Some can accept democracy faster than others. Every case is different, however "Democracy grows from the bottom up and cannot be imposed from the top down. Civil society has to be built from the inside out." He goes on to further explain exactly what the confederal option means and how it will help. "It certainly seems possible that the most attractive democratic ideal in the face of the brutal realities of Jihad and the dull realities of McWorld will be a confederal union of semi autonomous communities smaller than nation-states, tied together into regional economic associations and markets larger than nation-states—participatory and self-determining in local matters at the bottom, representative and accountable at the top. The nation-state would play a diminished role, and sovereignty would lose some of its political potency."

== See also ==
- The Clash of Civilizations
- The End of History and the Last Man
- The McDonaldization of Society
- The Lexus and the Olive Tree
