= Doris Frankel =

American screenwriter

Doris Frankel (March 20, 1909 – February 3, 1994) was an American playwright, poet, radio show writer, and television show writer. She graduated from Radcliffe College in 1930, later writing for several productions.

== Personal life ==
Frankel was the daughter of Benjamin Frankel, and was raised in New York City. She graduated from Radcliffe College in 1930, and from the Drama 47 Workshop at Yale University in 1932. She married Philip W. Barber, a theatre professional, in 1933. They had two sons before they divorced. One of her sons was political theorist Benjamin Barber.

When she took a hiatus from her career in 1943, she and her two sons went to the Japanese internment camp at Heart Mountain Relocation Center, to join her husband who worked there.

== Career ==
In the 1930s, Frankel wrote radio shows such as Cavalcade of America, Counterspy, and The Thin Man. She wrote a volume of poetry in 1930, titled The Sun Beats Down. She wrote the Broadway plays Don't Throw Glass Houses in 1938 and Love Me Long in 1949.

In her 1943 play Journey for an Unknown Soldier, she wrote about the racism against Japanese people at the time and how white Americans should accept them. It was written during a time when Japanese Americans were still interned in concentration camps and she was hopeful that White Americans could accept them.

In the 1950s, she wrote drama television shows for Playhouse 90 and Hallmark Hall of Fame. The first daytime serial for which she wrote was The Brighter Day. Frankel later wrote for the television shows General Hospital, Search for Tomorrow, and All My Children. In 1960, she wrote the musical One Little Girl, performed at the Camp Fire Girls annual convention in New York City.

== Reception ==
Frankel won an Emmy for her work on All My Children in the 1970s. In a 1949 Billboard review, Broadway critic Bob Francis wrote a negative review of Love Me Long, saying that Frankel's "little opus has neither originality or wit".

== Death ==
Doris Frankel died in 1994 from a stroke in Manhattan, aged 84.
