= Happy Meal =

Children's meal sold by McDonald's

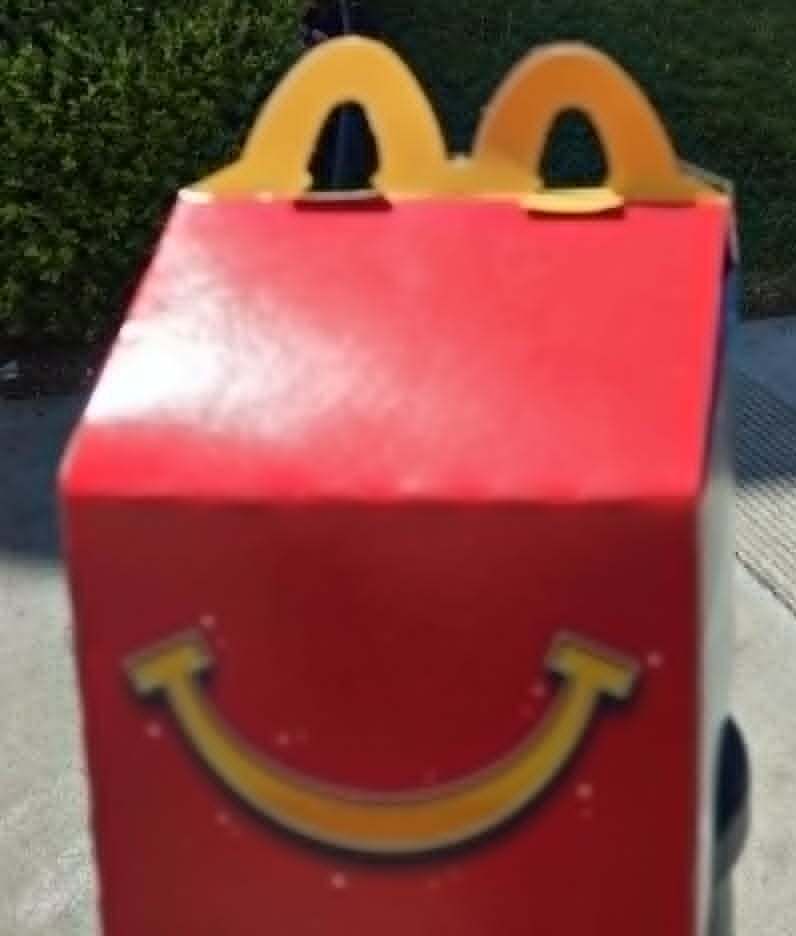
A Happy Meal

A Happy Meal is a kids' meal sold at the American fast food restaurant chain McDonald's since June 1979. A small toy or book is included with the food, both of which are usually contained in a red cardboard box with a yellow smiley face and the McDonald's logo. The packaging and toy are frequently part of a marketing tie-in to an existing television series, film or toyline.

== Description ==
The Happy Meal logo from 2004 to 2009 (US) and until 2020 in the UK, written in English

The Happy Meal logo in Japanese. Text reads "Happy Set" (Happī Setto) in katakana.

The Happy Meal logo in Spanish. Text reads "Little Happy Box" (Latin America).

The Happy Meal contains a main item (a hamburger, cheeseburger, McFish or small serving of Chicken McNuggets), a side item (French fries, apple slices, a Go-Gurt tube (now discontinued) or a salad in some areas) and a drink (milk, juice or a soft drink). The choice of items changes from country to country and may depend on the size of the restaurant.

In some countries, the choices have been expanded to include items such as a grilled cheese sandwich (known as a "Fry Kid"), or more healthy options such as apple slices, a mini snack wrap, salads or pasta, and in the Philippines, Filipino spaghetti, as one or more of the sides.

== History ==
In the mid-1970s, Yolanda Fernández de Cofiño began working with her husband operating McDonald's restaurants in Guatemala. She created what she called the "Menú Ronald" (Ronald menu), which offered a hamburger, small fries and a small sundae to help mothers feed their children more effectively while at McDonald's restaurants. The concept was eventually brought to the attention of McDonald's management in Chicago. The company gave the development of the product to Bob Bernstein, who then came up with the idea for the Happy Meal.

In 1977, the McDonald's restaurant owner clients who regularly met with Bernstein were looking for ways to create a better dining experience for families with kids. Bernstein reasoned that if kids could get a packaged meal all their own instead of just picking at their parent's food, everybody would be happier. He had often noticed his young son at the breakfast table poring over the various items on cereal boxes and thought, "Why not do that for McDonald's? The package is the key!" He then called in his creative team and had them mock up some paperboard boxes fashioned to resemble lunch pails with the McDonald's Golden Arches for handles. They called in nationally known children's illustrators and offered them the blank slate of filling the box's sides and tops with their own colorful ideas from art to jokes to games to comic strips to stories to fantasy: whatever they thought might appeal to kids, at least eight items per box. Inside the box would be a burger, small fries, packet of cookies and a surprise gift. A small drink would accompany these items. Bernstein then named it the Happy Meal and it was successfully introduced with television and radio spots and in-store posters in the Kansas City market in October 1977. Other markets followed and the national roll-out happened in 1979.

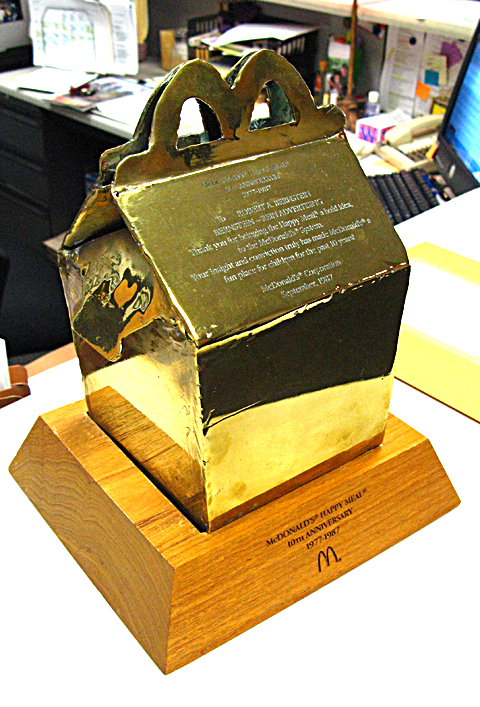
Golden Happy Meal presented to Robert Bernstein crediting him with creation of the Happy Meal

Bernstein received Trademark #1136758 (Serial #73148046) for his idea in 1977 which he assigned to his client, McDonald's Corporation, on June 10, 1980. In 1987 at the annual McDonald's marketing meeting, he was recognized for his accomplishment with a full-size golden replica of the Happy Meal box with the following inscription:

McDonald's Happy Meal 10th Anniversary 1977-1987
To Robert A. Bernstein, Bernstein-Rein Advertising
Thank you for bringing the Happy Meal, a bold idea, to the McDonald's System.
Your insight and conviction truly has made McDonald's a fun place for children for the past 10 years!
McDonald's Corporation
September, 1987

Often, the Happy Meal is themed to promote a children and family-oriented film or television series. The first such promotion was the "Star Trek Meal", which promoted Star Trek: The Motion Picture in December 1979. The packaging used for the Star Trek Meal consisted of various images and games related to the film, as well as a comic strip adaptation of the film. Consumers had to buy numerous meals in order to complete the set. In 1982, McDonald's recalled Playmobil Happy Meal toys because they could have been dangerous to children under three years of age. In 1992, McDonald's withdrew their range of Happy Meal toys for the film Batman Returns, after complaints from parents that the film was unsuitable for children.

In July 2011, McDonald's announced plans to make Happy Meals healthier, including the addition of apple slices. The redesigned meals would contain a smaller portion (1.1 ounces) of fries, along with the apple slices. On February 4, 2013, McDonald's announced that Fish McBites (fried Alaskan pollock, the same fish used in Filet-O-Fish) would be added as an entrée, which would run until March, intended to coincide with Lent.

In 2014, McDonald's introduced a mascot to Happy Meals in the United States named Happy, who originated in France and some international countries as early as 2009. Reactions were mixed, including criticism that the mascot's design was too frightening.

== Happy Meal toy ==
When the Happy Meal was launched in 1979, the toys were a McDoodler stencil, a McWrist wallet, an ID bracelet, a puzzle book, a spinning top, or a McDonaldland character-shaped eraser. In Canada, the promotion prior to the Happy Meal was called the "Treat of the Week", where a different toy was available free on request each week. Also before McDonald's introduced the Happy Meal, a competing chain, Burger Chef, sold kids' meals with small toys. They filed a lawsuit against McDonald's after the launch of the Happy Meal, but it was dismissed.

Happy Meal toys have also become increasingly elaborate in recent years. While they were initially cheap items such as a Frisbee or ball, they have gradually been replaced with increasingly sophisticated toys, many of which are a tie-in to an existing TV series, film, video game or toy line.

The Happy Meal toys are designed for ages 2+, while the toddler toys are aimed at 3 and younger.

=== Bans ===
On November 2, 2010, the San Francisco Board of Supervisors passed a law requiring that children's meals sold in restaurants meet certain nutritional standards before they could be sold with toys. The law, urged in part by an increase of childhood obesity in the United States, would allow toys to be included with children's meals that have fewer than 600 calories and fewer than 640 milligrams of sodium, contain fruits and vegetables, and include beverages without excessive fat or sugar. The board overturned the veto of Mayor Gavin Newsom on November 23, 2010, to pass the law. The law has been ridiculed by the satirical news program The Daily Show. McDonald's circumvented the ban by charging 10 cents for the toys.

A class action lawsuit seeking to ban Happy Meal toys in California was filed in 2010. The suit was dismissed in April 2012.

In Chile, the Happy Meal, along with kids' meals at other fast food chains, no longer includes free toys, in response to a 2012 law banning such toys in a move to prevent obesity.

== Adult versions ==
=== 2004 Active Fit Happy Meal ===
An adult version of the Happy Meal was released in 2004 with McDonald's "Active Fit" Happy Meal. The adult meal came in a special adult size happy meal box and included a bottle of water, salad, an exercise booklet, and a "step-o-meter".

=== 2022 Cactus Plant Flea Market collaboration ===
In 2022, an adult version of the Happy Meal was released as a timed collaboration with fashion brand Cactus Plant Flea Market. The meal, which included a standard Big Mac or Chicken McNuggets combo meal, came with a collectible toy of the brand's mascot Cactus Buddy or four-eyed variants of McDonaldland characters Grimace, Birdie or the Hamburglar.

=== 2023 Kerwin Frost collaboration ===
Following the success of the 2022 promotion, McDonald's launched another adult Happy Meal promotion the following year, this time in collaboration with entertainer Kerwin Frost. The 2023 edition featured the same choices of meals along with figurines of the McNugget Buddies, with updated designs from Frost.

=== 2024 Collector's Meals ===
In 2024, a limited time version of the Happy Meal was released called Collector's Meals. The meal, included a 10-piece nugget or Big Mac along with fries or a drink for lunch, or a sausage and egg sandwich, hash browns, and a hot coffee for breakfast. Along with the meal, collectible cups came with the meal at participating U.S. stores. The designs include McDonald's, Coca-Cola, Hello Kitty & Peanuts, Beanie Babies, Barbie & Hot Wheels, and Shrek, Jurassic Park & Minions.

=== 2025 McDonaldland Meal ===
In 2025, McDonald's released a new adult Happy Meal called the McDonaldland Meal. The meal came with a Quarter Pounder with cheese or a 10-piece Chicken McNuggets, fries, and the new Mt. McDonaldland Shake. Along with the meal, there's a collectible tin that's filled with stickers and postcards featuring the brand's characters like Ronald McDonald, Grimace, Birdie, Hamburglar, Mayor McCheese, and the Fry Friends (a.k.a. the Fry Guys).

== Notable marketing tie-ins ==
Brands and products have frequently created marketing tie-ins with McDonald's Happy Meals, with notable collaborations including:

- Batman car figures
- Disney
  - The Lion King
  - Cinderella
  - Frozen II
  - Little Mermaid
  - The Lion King
  - Mickey Mouse
  - Pocahontas
  - Snow White and the Seven Dwarfs
- Garfield vehicles
- Hot Wheels (collection)
- My Little Pony (collection)
- Muppet Babies
- Play-Doh (Hasbro)
- Pokémon Trading Card Game
- Teenie Beanie Babies (collection)
- The Dog (Collection )
- Neopets

== See also ==
- Kids' meal
- Burger King Kids Club
