= The McDonaldization of Society =

1993 English-language book by George Ritzer

- 20th Anniversary Edition cover art
- Author: George Ritzer
- Language: English
- Subject: McDonaldization
- Genre: Non-fiction
- Publication date: 1993

The McDonaldization of Society was first proposed by sociologist George Ritzer in an article for The Journal of American Culture and expanded in his 1993 book of the same name. Ritzer suggests that in the later part of the 20th century the socially-structured form of the fast-food restaurant has become the organizational force representing and extending the process of rationalization into the realm of everyday interaction and individual identity. McDonald's of the 1990s serves as the case model. The book introduced the term McDonaldization to learned discourse as a way to describe a social process which produces "mind-numbing sameness", according to a 2002 review of a related academic text.

In McDonaldization Ritzer expands and updates central elements from the work of Max Weber and produces a critical analysis of the impact of social-structural change on human interaction and identity. The central theme in Weber's analysis of modern society was the process of rationalization; a far-reaching process whereby traditional modes of thinking were replaced by an ends/means analysis concerned with efficiency and formalized social control. Weber argued that the archetypal manifestation of this process was the bureaucracy; a large, formal organization characterized by a hierarchical authority structure, well-established division of labor, written rules and regulations, impersonality and a concern for technical competence. Bureaucratic organizations not only represent the process of rationalization, the structure they impose on human interaction and thinking furthers the process, leading to an increasingly rationalized world. The process affects all aspects of everyday life.

== Applications and alternatives to the McDonaldization concept ==
McDonaldization is mentioned in over 8,600 publications and has been applied to countless institutions from archives to universities and zoos.

However, there are also critics of the concept. Aaron Ahuvia and Elif Izberk-Bilgin argue that while McDonaldization represents a particular collection of forces, there is a countertrend in post-industrial societies they call eBayization. Whereas McDonaldization produces homogeneity and predictability, eBayization provides variety, adventure, and surprise. Tony Blackshaw presents IKEAization as another countertrend, distinguished by seven dimensions:

- Home (another word for Community)
- Democracy
- Incalculability and Unpredictability
- Provincialism
- Protestant Work Ethic
- Cool
- Freedom.

On the 40th anniversary of Ritzer's article, The Journal of American Culture published 'Unwrapping the McDonald's model: An introduction to dynamic social theory', in which Titus Alexander argues that "Ritzer's analysis does not enable people to solve social problems or improve society. If anything, it paralyzes people into believing McDonaldization is an unstoppable behemoth they are powerless to influence." Alexander uses McDonald's to illustrate the thesis that institutions are everyday social experiments which embody knowledge about how to do things in society. McDonald's itself continuously adapts to difficult cultures and contexts using nine distinct layers of analysis. Alexander aims to show how social research can empower people to improve society by working on institutions as social models ("dynamic social theories"), citing Toyota, the Buurtzorg model of social care, and cooperatives as alternative models to McDonaldization.

== See also ==
- McDonaldization
- Jihad vs. McWorld
