= Kids' meal =

Fast food meal marketed to children

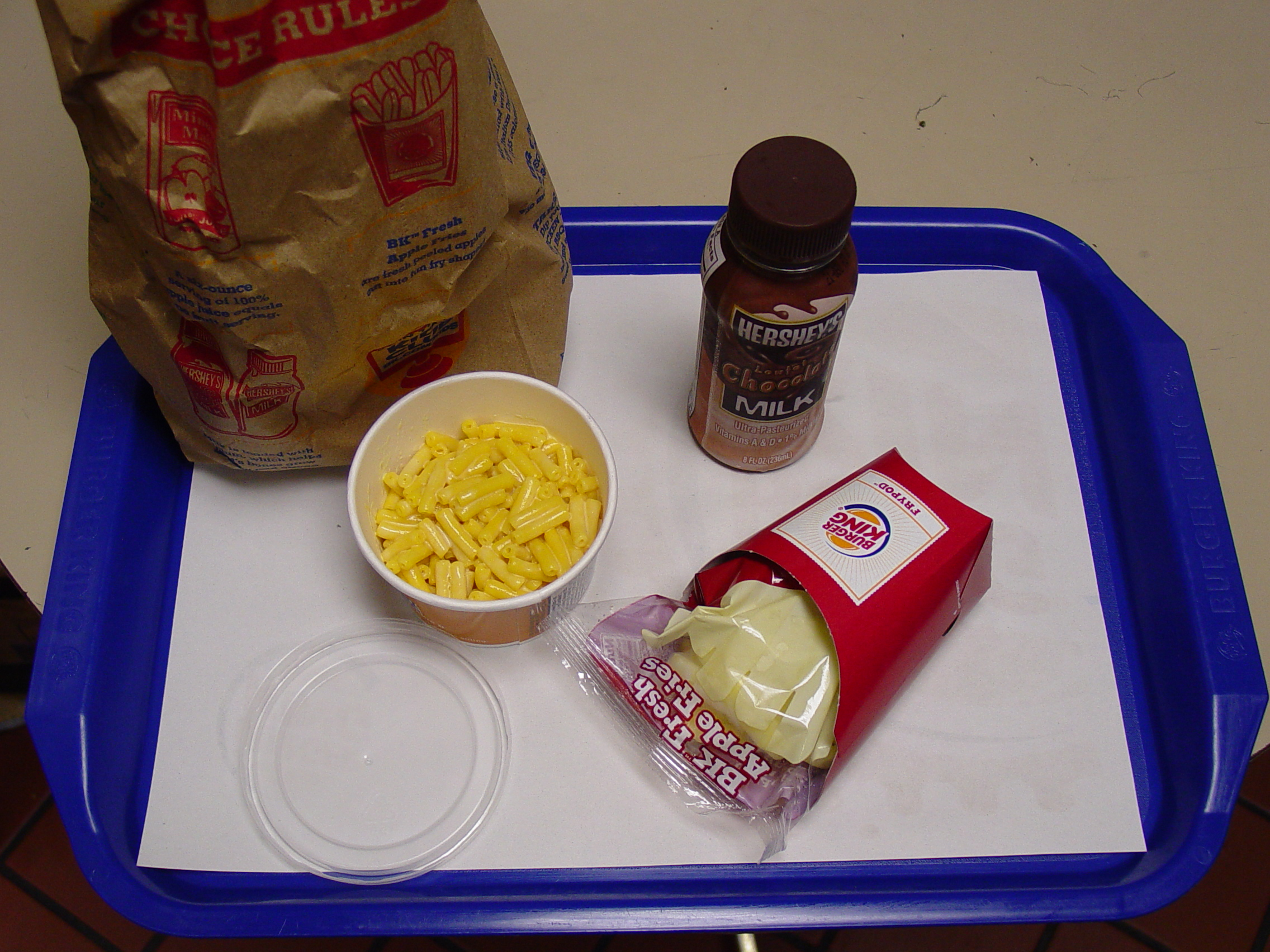
Items from a Burger King kids' meal: apple fries, chocolate milk and a portion of macaroni and cheese

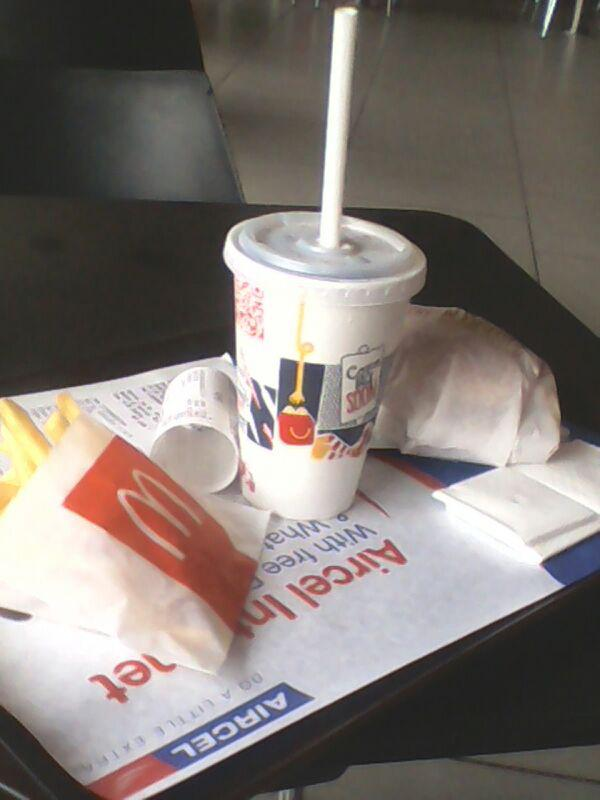
The McDonald's kids' meal is called a Happy Meal.

The kids' meal or children's meal is a fast food combination meal tailored to and marketed to children. Most kids' meals are sold in bags or cardboard boxes which are decorated with depictions of activities, games or characters from a franchise tie-in. In addition to food they often contain a toy, which may be part of said tie-in. Most standard kids' meals comprise a burger or chicken nuggets, a side item (usually fries), and a soft drink.

== History ==
One of the earliest kids' meal, Funmeal, emerged at Burger Chef in 1973 and succeeded. Discerning the popularity of the kids' meal, McDonald's introduced its Happy Meal in 1978, (Note: Burger Chef filed suit against McDonald's over the Happy Meal but lost the case.) and other fast food corporations, including Burger King, followed suit with their own kids' meals.

Some fast food corporations considered children as their "most important" customers, owing to the success of kids' meals. Their effectiveness has been ascribed to the fact that the patronage of children often means the patronage of a family and to the allure of the toys, which often are in collectible series. In 2006, $360 million of the expenditures of fast food corporations was for toys in kids' meals, which numbered over 1.2 billion.

In recent years, the popularity of the kids' meal has receded, with a study by NPD Group indicating that there was a 6% decrease in kids' meal sales in 2011. Explanations include parents' concerns over the nutritional value of kids' meals, parents' desire to save money (opting instead to order from the value menu), as well as children outgrowing the meals earlier than before. Children have "become more sophisticated in their palates" and seek items from the regular menu but in smaller servings. Kids' meal toys are also less appealing to the increasingly technology-oriented youth, who prefer video games.

Kids' meals have evolved in response to criticism, offering healthier selections and greater variety. In 2011, nineteen food chains participating in the Kids Live Well initiative—including Burger King, Denny's, IHOP, Chili's, Friendly's, Chevy's, and El Pollo Loco—pledged to "offer at least one children's meal that has fewer than 600 calories, no soft drinks and at least two items from the following food groups: fruits, vegetables, whole grains, lean proteins or low-fat dairy".

== Criticism ==
There have been concerns from food critics about the nutritional value of kids' meals. A 2010 study by the Rudd Center for Food Policy and Obesity inspecting the kids' meals of twelve US food chains concluded that of 3,039 entrée combinations, twelve satisfied the advised levels of fat, sodium, and calories for preschool kids and fifteen met these standards for older kids.

=== Inappropriate toys ===
Burger King has received controversy for promoting and aiming at children several PG-13 rated films, including The Lost World: Jurassic Park, Small Soldiers, Wild Wild West, Star Wars: Episode III – Revenge of the Sith, and The Simpsons Movie. McDonald's similarly received criticism for releasing Happy Meal toys for the film Batman Returns, eventually recalling and stopping the promotion of the toys following complaints from parents that Batman Returns was unsuitable for young children. Despite the controversy, McDonald's still promoted the film's sequel Batman Forever three years later. When McDonald's promoted 2015's Minions there was controversy because parents thought one of the toys used profanity.

== Legislation ==
In the United States, kids' meals have been blamed for ingraining unhealthy dietary habits in children and augmenting childhood obesity. In 2010, Santa Clara County, California implemented a ban on toys accompanying kids' meals that fail nutritional standards; affected restaurants showed a 2.8- to 3.4-fold improvement in Children's Menu Assessment scores from pre- to post-ordinance (e.g., improvements in on-site nutritional guidance; promotion of healthy meals, beverages, and side items; and toy marketing and distribution activities) with minimal changes at unaffected restaurants. San Francisco County enacted the same ban, and similar ones have been proposed or considered in other cities or states across the country. (Note: New York City; Superior, Wisconsin; Nebraska) Research that examined the impact of the San Francisco ban indicated that both affected restaurant chains responded to the ordinance by selling toys separately from children's meals, but neither changed their menus to meet ordinance-specified nutrition criteria. Conversely, legislators in Arizona prohibited such restrictions, and Florida state senators proposed the same.

Outside the United States, Spain and Brazil have also considered such measures. In 2012, Chile banned toys in kids' meals altogether.

== See also ==
- List of restaurant terminology
