= McWorld =

Term referring to spread of McDonald's restaurants

McWorld is a term referring to the spread of McDonald's restaurants through the world as the result of globalization, and more generally to the effects of international "McDonaldization" of services and commercialization of goods as an element of globalization as a whole. The name also refers to a 1990s advertising campaign for McDonald's, and a children's website launched by the firm in 2008.

== Globalization-related term ==
Critics claim that fast food chain restaurants such as McDonald's are destructive towards many aspects of the indigenous cultures in countries where they have been introduced.

In March 1992, an article first published in The Atlantic Monthly by Rutgers political science professor Benjamin Barber entitled "Jihad vs. McWorld", described international commercialization as one of two great clashing forces of the 21st century, the other being tribalistic fundamentalism. According to his writing, there are four imperatives which constitute the McWorld: a market imperative, a resource imperative, an information technology imperative, and an ecological imperative. The four imperatives are transnational, transideological, transcultural and ecological. The contrasting idea of McWorld, the Jihad, unlike those four imperatives, stresses identity of each community. The clashing forces result from what Barber explains as the two core doctrines of our age: globalism and retribalization.

The article was expanded and published in 1995 as a bestselling book. McWorld does not necessarily relate to democracy. It cares about the elements of democracy, but only to the degree that it promotes economic production and consumption. In the book, Barber explains that liberalization of nation state oriented markets to a globalized market does not seem democratic. Democracy and liberal capitalism are terms commonly used as a correlation; how democracy leads to capitalist economy and vice versa. However Barber argues that multinational corporations pursuing profits outside their home country due to competition has less correlation with open society.

A 1999 book entitled Mustard Seed Versus McWorld by evangelical minister Tom Sine implores Christians to reject the diminution of religious values that he contends results from excessive commercialization.

== 1990s advertising campaign ==
The name McWorld was originally the name of a TV campaign for the restaurant by Leo Burnett that ran many of its ads during Saturday morning cartoons and on other television channels and programming blocks targeted at children in the United States in the mid-1990s. The advertisements featured the exciting McDonald's-related happenings that would purportedly occur if children ran the world. These included fantasies such as having gym class every period in school and eating McDonald's at every meal. In addition to planet Earth, McWorld ads featured children ruling school, space, and other arenas typically dominated by an adult hegemony; adults were portrayed as inferior and ineffective. Memorably, each spot concluded with the phrase, "McWORLD! Hey, it could happen!", as a guitar chord played in the background. One such spot won a Golden Marble Award in 1998.

== 2008 website ==
McWorld was also the name of an interactive "virtual world" website launched by McDonald's in 2008 on happymeal.com and aimed at children. Visitors to the website could play games, go on quests, earn points and buy accessories for their tree houses and avatars (called "mPals"), including Fez the Monkey, Radish the Dog, and Yammy the Cat. The website shut down on February 7, 2014 and was replaced by McPlay.

While the McWorld website bore some similarities to the ideas in the original McWorld campaign, such as children being in charge, it is an essentially distinct concept, created independently for a younger age group. McWorld was named by a vote of kids on happymeal.com.

== See also ==
- Big Mac Index
- Cultural globalization
- Golden Arches Theory of Conflict Prevention
- Jihad vs. McWorld, book by Benjamin Barber
- List of countries with McDonald's franchises
- McDonald's
- McDonaldization
  - McDonald's Video Game
