= Iron cage =

Concept in sociology

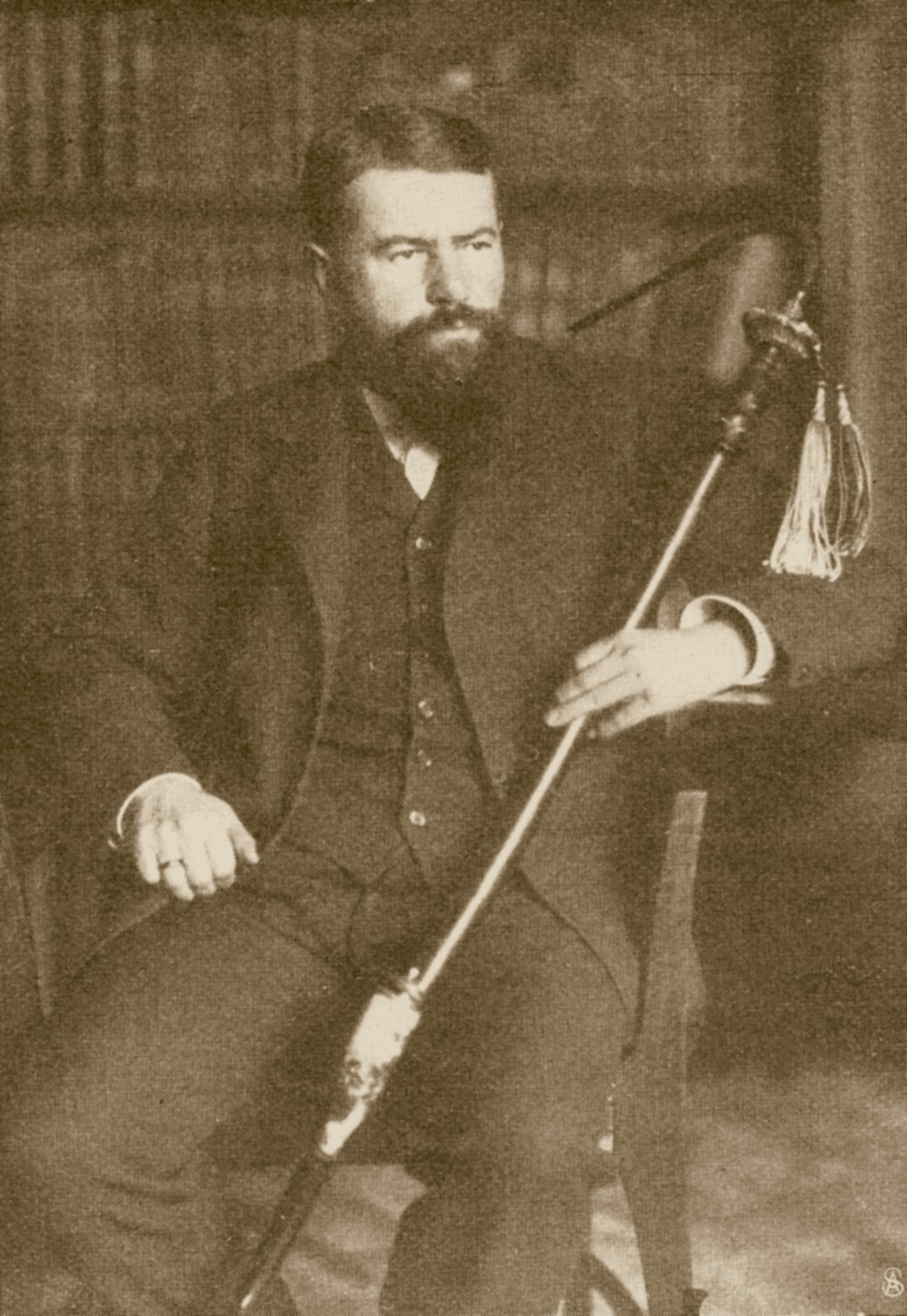
Weber in 1907

In sociology, the iron cage is a concept introduced by Max Weber to describe the increased rationalization inherent in social life, particularly in Western capitalist societies. The "iron cage" thus traps individuals in systems based purely on teleological efficiency, rational calculation and control. Weber also described the bureaucratization of social order as "the polar night of icy darkness".

The original German term is stahlhartes Gehäuse (steel-hard casing); this was translated into "iron cage", an expression made familiar to English-speakers by Talcott Parsons in his 1930 translation of Weber's The Protestant Ethic and the Spirit of Capitalism. This choice has been questioned recently by scholars who prefer the more direct translation: "shell as hard as steel".

Weber (in Parsons' translation) wrote:

In Baxter's view the care for external goods should only lie on the shoulders of the 'saint like a light cloak, which can be thrown aside at any moment.' But fate decreed that the cloak should become an iron cage.

== Iron cage of capitalism ==
In his 1904 book The Protestant Ethic and the Spirit of Capitalism, Weber introduces the metaphor of an "iron cage":

The Puritan wanted to work in a calling; we are forced to do so. For when asceticism was carried out of monastic cells into everyday life, and began to dominate worldly morality, it did its part in building the tremendous cosmos of the modern economic order. This order is now bound to the technical and economic conditions of machine production which to-day determine the lives of all the individuals who are born into this mechanism, not only those directly concerned with economic acquisition, with irresistible force. Perhaps it will so determine them until the last ton of fossilized coal is burnt. In Baxter's view the care for external goods should only lie on the shoulders of the "saint like a light cloak, which can be thrown aside at any moment". But fate decreed that the cloak should become an iron cage.

According to Weber, the market-dominated economic order was created by innovative, religiously motivated economic forces. But the individual today can no longer engage in such creative action. Instead, the worker must operate in a narrowly defined specialization, and economic enterprises must continually strive to maximize profits and rationalize their production for the sake of efficiency. This is the present-day iron cage of institutionalized capitalism.

Weber presents his argument in an ironic form. Religion of a particular sort was necessary to revolutionize the economy and the world. A Protestant ethic drove the reorganization of traditional economic life to become a calculating efficient system. But now such religious views are no longer needed to sustain capitalism. Moreover, the systematic efficient calculations of capitalism help propel the secularization of the world and the decline in religious belief. Weber argues that "The course of development ... involves ... the bringing in of calculation into the traditional brotherhood, displacing the old religious relationship."

Some have argued that Weber never wrote of an "iron cage" and that its attribution to Weber is due to a mistranslation of Weber by Talcott Parsons.

== Effects of bureaucracies ==
=== Positive contributions ===
Bureaucracies were distinct from the feudal system and patrimonialism where people were promoted on the basis of personal relationships. In bureaucracies, there was a set of rules that are clearly defined and promotion through technical qualifications, seniority and disciplinary control. Weber believes that this influenced modern society and how we operate today, especially politically.

Bureaucratic formalism is often connected to Weber's metaphor of the iron cage because the bureaucracy is the greatest expression of rationality.

Weber wrote that bureaucracies are goal-oriented organizations that are based on rational principles that are used to efficiently reach their goals. However, Weber also recognizes that there are constraints within the "iron cage" of such a bureaucratic system.

=== Negative effects of bureaucracies ===
Bureaucracies concentrate large amounts of power in a small number of people and are generally unregulated. Weber believed that those who control these organizations control the quality of our lives as well. Bureaucracies tend to generate oligarchy; which is where a few officials are the political and economic power. According to Weber, because bureaucracy is a form of organization superior to all others, further bureaucratization and rationalization may be an inescapable fate.

== Iron cage of bureaucracy ==
Because of these aforementioned reasons, there will be an evolution of an iron cage, which will be a technically ordered, rigid, dehumanized society. The iron cage is the one set of rules and laws that we are all subjected and must adhere to. Bureaucracy puts us in an iron cage, which limits individual human freedom and potential instead of a "technological eutopia" that should set us free. It is the way of the institution, where we do not have a choice anymore. Once capitalism came about, it was like a machine that you were being pulled into without an alternative option. Laws of bureaucracies include the following:

1. The official is subject to authority only with respect to their official obligation
2. Organized in a clearly defined hierarchy of offices
3. Each office has a clearly defined sphere of competence
4. The official has a free contractual relationship; free selection
5. Officials are selected through technical qualification
6. The official is paid by fixed salaries
7. The office is the primary occupation of the official
8. Promotion is based on an achievement which is granted by the judgment of superiors
9. The official works entirely separated from ownership of the means of administration
10. The official is subject to strict and systematic discipline within the office

== Costs of bureaucracies ==
Rational calculation ... reduces every worker to a cog in this bureaucratic machine and, seeing himself in this light, he will merely ask how to transform himself ... to a bigger cog ... The passion for bureaucratization at this meeting drives us to despair.

- Loss of individuality; labor is now being sold to someone who is in control, instead of individuals being artisans and craftsmen and benefiting from their own labor.
- Loss of autonomy; others are dictating what an individual's services are worth.
- Individuals develop an obsession with moving on to bigger and better positions, but someone else will always be determining the value of their achievements.
- Lack of individual freedom; individuals can no longer engage in a society unless they belong to a large scale organization where they are given specific tasks in return for giving up their personal desires to conform to the bureaucracy's goals and are now following legal authority.
- Specialization; with specialization, society becomes more interdependent and has a less common purpose. There is a loss in the sense of community because the purpose of bureaucracies is to get the job done efficiently.

Bureaucratic hierarchies can control resources in pursuit of their own personal interests, which impacts society's lives greatly and society has no control over this. It also affects society's political order and governments because bureaucracies were built to regulate these organizations, but corruption remains an issue. The goal of the bureaucracy has a single-minded pursuit that can ruin social order; what might be good for the organization might not be good for the society as a whole, which can later harm the bureaucracy's future. Formal rationalization in bureaucracy has its problems as well. There are issues of control, depersonalization and increasing domination. Once the bureaucracy is created, the control is indestructible. There is only one set of rules and procedures, which reduces everyone to the same level. Depersonalization occurs because individual situations are not accounted for. Most importantly, the bureaucracies will become more dominating over time unless they are stopped. In an advanced industrial-bureaucratic society, everything becomes part of the expanding machine, even people.

While bureaucracies are supposed to be based on rationalization, they act in the exact opposite manner. Political bureaucracies are established so that they protect our civil liberties, but they violate them with their imposing rules. Development and agricultural bureaucracies are set so that they help farmers, but put them out of business due to market competition that the bureaucracies contribute to. Service bureaucracies like health care are set to help the sick and elderly, but then they deny care based on specific criteria.

== Debates regarding bureaucracies ==
Weber argues that bureaucracies have dominated modern society's social structure; but we need these bureaucracies to help regulate our complex society. Bureaucracies may have desirable intentions to some, but they tend to undermine human freedom and democracy in the long run.

Rationalization destroyed the authority of magical powers, but it also brought into being the machine-like regulation of bureaucracy, which ultimately challenges all systems of belief.

According to Weber, society sets up these bureaucratic systems, and it is up to society to change them. Weber argues that it is very difficult to change or break these bureaucracies, but if they are indeed socially constructed, then society should be able to intervene and shift the system.
