= Benjamin Barber =

American political theorist (1939–2017)

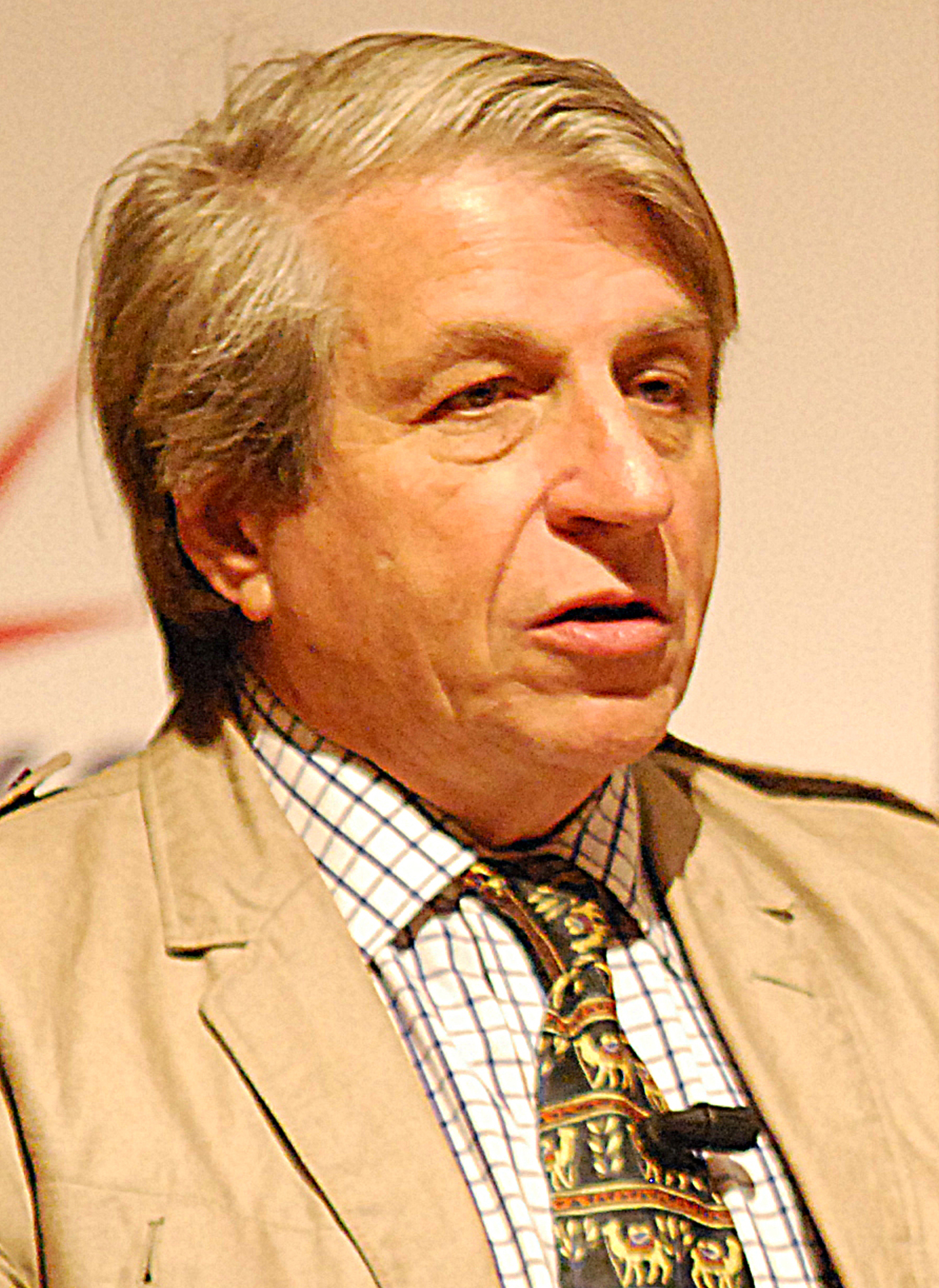
- Barber in 2010
- Born: August 2, 1939; New York City, New York, U.S.
- Died: April 24, 2017 (aged 77); New York City, New York, U.S.
- Education: Harvard University; Grinnell College
- Occupations: Academic and think tank employee
- Writing career
- Genre: Political theory

Benjamin R. Barber (August 2, 1939 – April 24, 2017) was an American political theorist and author, perhaps best known for his 1995 bestseller, Jihad vs. McWorld, and for 2013's If Mayors Ruled the World. His 1984 book of political theory, Strong Democracy, was revised and reissued in 2004. He was an adviser to political leaders including Bill Clinton and Howard Dean.

== Personal life ==
Barber was born in New York City in 1939. He was educated at Grinnell College (B.A., 1960) and Harvard University (M.A. in government, 1963; Ph.D., 1966), after earning certificates at Albert Schweitzer College (1959) and the London School of Economics (1957).

Barber's father, Philip W. Barber, directed the New York City unit of the Federal Theatre Project, which produced plays including Macbeth and the Living Newspaper. His mother, Doris Frankel, was a playwright and wrote for television shows including All My Children. Barber was also active as a playwright, lyricist (libretto for George Quincy's opera Home and the River) and film-maker (The Struggle for Democracy, with Patrick Watson, and Music Inn, with Ben Barenholtz).

Barber died on April 24, 2017, after a four-month battle with cancer.

== Career ==
Barber was a senior research scholar at The Center on Philanthropy and Civil Society of The Graduate Center, The City University of New York, the president and founder of the Interdependence Movement, and Walt Whitman Professor of Political Science Emeritus, Rutgers University. In 2001 he joined the Department of Government and Politics at the University of Maryland as Kekst Professor of Civil Society. From 2007 till 2012, he was a distinguished senior fellow at Demos.

As a political theorist, Barber argued for a renewed focus on civil society and engaged citizenship as tools for building effective democracy, particularly in the post-Cold War world. His work examined the failure of nation-states to address global problems, and argued that cities and intercity associations are more effectively addressing shared concerns. Barber was a senior fellow at the USC Center on Public Diplomacy in 2005–2017. In February 2016, he joined the Fordham University Urban Consortium as its first Distinguished Senior Fellow and announced the inaugural convening of the Global Parliament of Mayors.

Barber was an outside adviser to President Bill Clinton and a foreign policy adviser to Howard Dean's 2004 presidential campaign. He advised political parties and political leaders in the UK, Germany, Austria, Denmark, Finland and Italy on civic education and participatory institutions.

Barber met with and worked alongside civil society and government leaders in Turkey, the United Arab Emirates, China, and Muammar Gaddafi's Libya.

== Thesis on Freedom ==
In his book The Death of Communal Liberty: A History of Freedom in a Swiss Mountain Canton published in 1974 Barber reflects on the history of Canton Graubünden. He argued that the inhabitants of the Canton regarded freedom as the liberty to live under self-government and the right to be bound by own choice. Instead of rat-racing for ever more money and consumer goods, the Swiss citizen in that Canton felt enough solidarity to uphold a community. This is why, according to Barber, Swiss citizens resisted guest workers in the 1960s and 1970s.

== Thesis on Strong Democracy ==
In the 2004 preface to his Strong Democracy, Barber explains the central premise of that book: "Once established strongly in the political and civic realm, democracy can assure sufficient equality and justice to coexist with a variety of economic systems."

He goes on to say that his goal in writing that book was not "to replace representative with strong democracy, but to thicken thin democracy with a critical overlay of participatory institutions."

Barber went on to propose "a national initiative and referendum act" which would "permit Americans to petition for a legislative referendum either on popular initiatives or on laws passed by Congress."

== Honors ==
Barber's honors included a knighthood from the French Government (Palmes Academiques/Chevalier) (2001), the Berlin Prize of the American Academy in Berlin (2001) and the John Dewey Award (2003). He was also awarded Guggenheim, Fulbright, and Social Science Research Fellowships, honorary doctorates from Grinnell College, Monmouth University and Connecticut College, and held the chair of American Civilization at the École des hautes études en sciences sociales in Paris.

== 2016 elections ==
In November 2016, Barber expressed the opinion that Black Americans who vote for Republicans vote against their own interests in an undercover video produced by controversial conservative activist group Project Veritas earlier that year.

When confronted about his remarks by news station WRAL, Barber responded that the analogy to Sonderkommandos "was an overstatement and not one that I would make in public. I stand by the basic view that people of color – Latinos and African-Americans and others – who are voting for Trump are voting in total disregard of their own long-range interests and in total obliviousness to everything that Trump has said about Latinos, about immigrants, about African-Americans, his own racist record."

== Donations ==
Barber donated $12,825 to various political campaigns between 2008 and 2016, and described himself as an experienced fundraiser in his biography.

== Publications ==
- Superman and Common Men: Freedom, Anarchy and the Revolution (1971) ISBN 978-0-14-021430-7
- The Death of Communal Liberty: A History of Freedom in a Swiss Mountain Canton (1974) ISBN 978-0-691-61808-1
- Liberating Feminism (1976) ISBN 978-0-8164-9214-5
- Marriage Voices (1981 novel) ISBN 978-0-671-44808-0
- Strong Democracy: Participatory Politics for a New Age (1984) ISBN 978-0-520-05115-7
- The Conquest of Politics: Liberal Philosophy in Democratic Times (1988) ISBN 978-0-691-07764-2
- An Aristocracy of Everyone: The Politics Of Education and the Future of America (1992) ISBN 978-0-19-985417-2
- America Skips School (1993) appeared in Harper's Magazine
- Jihad vs. McWorld: How Globalism and Tribalism Are Reshaping the World (1996) ISBN 978-0-345-38304-4
- A Place for Us: How to Make Society Civil and Democracy Strong (1998) ISBN 978-0-8090-7656-7
- A Passion for Democracy: American Essays (2000) ISBN 978-0-691-05024-9
- The Truth of Power: Intellectual Affairs in the Clinton White House (2001) ISBN 978-0-231-14439-1
- Fear's Empire: War, Terrorism, and Democracy in an Age of Interdependence (2003) ISBN 978-0-393-32578-2
- Strong Democracy: Participatory Politics for a New Age (Twentieth Anniversary Revision 2004) ISBN 978-0-520-24233-3
- Schwächt oder stärkt E-Technologie die Demokratie?, in: Robertson-von Trotha, Caroline Y. (ed.): Kultur und Gerechtigkeit (= Kulturwissenschaft interdisziplinär/Interdisciplinary Studies on Culture and Society, Vol. 2), Baden-Baden (2007)
- Consumed: How Markets Corrupt Children, Infantilize Adults, and Swallow Citizens Whole (2007) ISBN 978-0-393-04961-9
- If Mayors Ruled the World: Dysfunctional Nations, Rising Cities] (2013) ISBN 978-0-300-16467-1
- Cool Cities: Urban Sovereignty and the Fix for Global Warming (2017) ISBN 978-0-300-22420-7

== Blog and media appearances ==
- Official website
- Benjamin Barber at TED
  - Why mayors should rule the world, a TED talk (TEDGlobal 2013)
- CivWorld
- Appearances on C-SPAN
- The Interdependence Movement
- A Conversation on American Political Culture with Benjamin Barber
- Barber discusses his book Consumed: How markets corrupt.... Audio on Media Matters April 15, 2007 UIUC.EDU
- Interview with Benjamin R. Barber by JK Fowler for The Mantle March 19, 2011
- A film clip "The Open Mind – A New Requirement for the Educated Person: Community Service (1990)" is available for viewing at the Internet Archive
