= Rationalization (sociology) =

Rationality tending to replace tradition

In sociology, rationalization (or rationalisation) is the replacement of traditions, values, and emotions as motivators for behavior in society with concepts based on rationality and reason. The term was coined by Max Weber, a German sociologist, jurist, and economist, and it is a central theme in his work.

The term 'rational' is seen in the context of people, their expressions, and or their actions. This term can be applied to people who can perform speech or in general any action, in addition to the views of rationality within people. It can be seen in the perspective of something such as a worldview or perspective (idea). For example, the implementation of bureaucracies in government is a kind of rationalization, as is the construction of high-efficiency living spaces in architecture and urban planning. A potential reason as to why rationalization of a culture may take place in the modern era is the process of globalization. Countries are becoming increasingly interlinked, and with the rise of technology, it is easier for countries to influence each other through social networking, the media and politics. An example of rationalization in place would be the case of witch doctors in certain parts of Africa. Whilst many locals view them as an important part of their culture and traditions, development initiatives and aid workers have tried to rationalize the practice in order to educate the local people in modern medicine and practice.

Many sociologists, critical theorists and contemporary philosophers have argued that rationalization, falsely assumed as progress, has had a negative and dehumanizing effect on society, moving modernity away from the central tenets of Enlightenment. The founders of sociology had critical reaction to rationalization:

Marx and Engels associated the emergence of modern society above all with the development of capitalism; for Durkheim it was connected in particular with industrialization and the new social division of labour which this brought about; for Weber it had to do with the emergence of a distinctive way of thinking, the rational calculation which he associated with the Protestant Ethic (more or less what Marx and Engels speak of in terms of those 'icy waves of egotistical calculation').

— John Harriss, The Second Great Transformation? Capitalism at the End of the Twentieth Century 1992

== Capitalism ==
Rationalization formed a central concept in the foundation of classical sociology, particularly with respect to the emphasis the discipline placed – by contrast with anthropology – on the nature of modern Western societies. The term was presented by the profoundly influential German antipositivist Max Weber, though its themes bear parallel with the critiques of modernity set forth by a number of scholars.

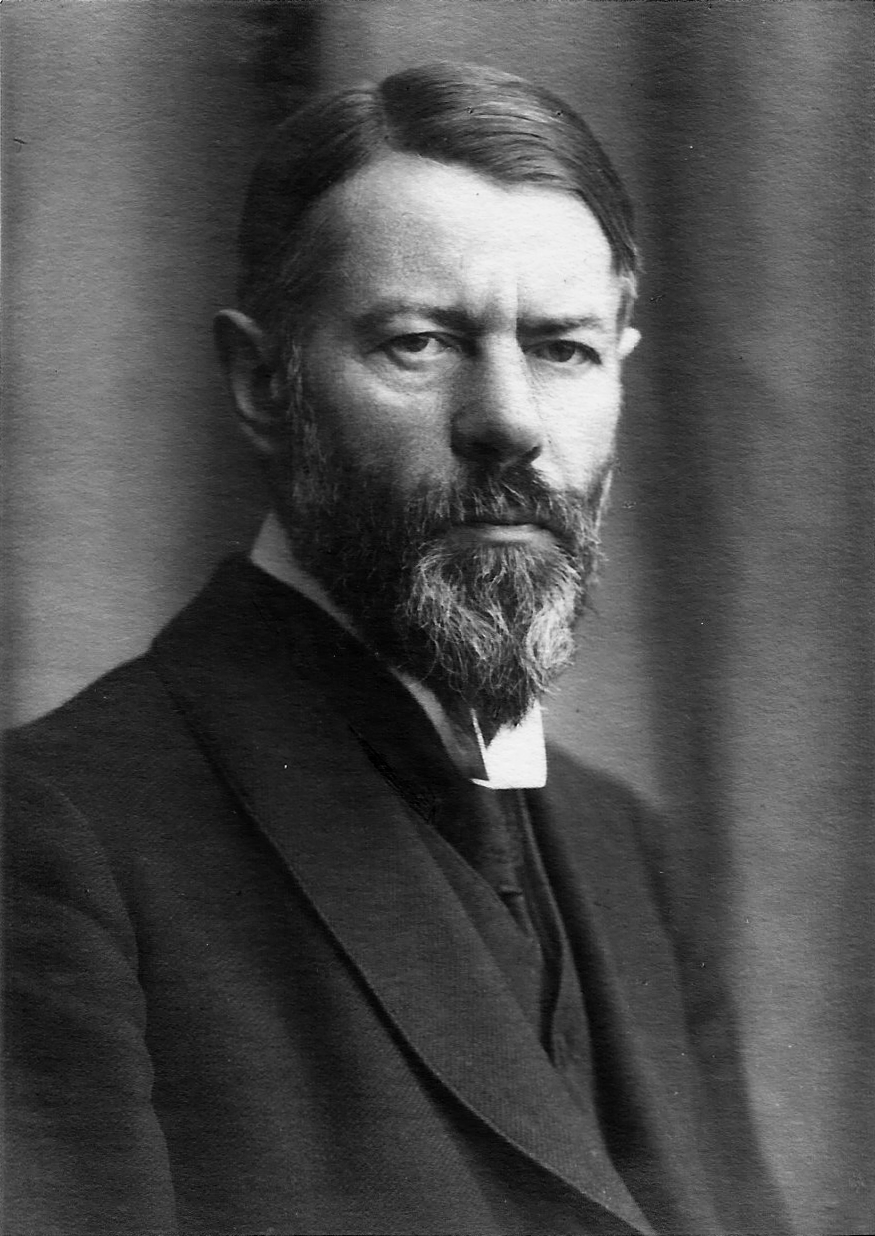
Max Weber in 1918

Weber demonstrated rationalization in The Protestant Ethic and the Spirit of Capitalism, in which the aims of certain Protestant Theologies, particularly Calvinism, are shown to have shifted towards rational means of economic gain as a way of dealing with their 'salvation anxiety'. The rational consequences of this doctrine, he argued, soon grew incompatible with its religious roots, and so the latter were eventually discarded. Weber continues his investigation into this matter in later works, notably in his studies on bureaucracy and on the classifications of authority. In these works he alludes to an inevitable move towards rationalization.

Weber believed that a move towards rational-legal authority was inevitable. In charismatic authority, the death of a leader effectively ends the power of that authority, and only through a rationalized and bureaucratic base can this authority be passed on. Traditional authorities in rationalized societies also tend to develop a rational-legal base to better ensure a stable accession. (See also: Tripartite classification of authority)

What Weber depicted was not only the secularization of Western culture, but also and especially the development of modern societies from the viewpoint of rationalization. The new structures of society were marked by the differentiation of the two functionally intermeshing systems that had taken shape around the organizational cores of the capitalist enterprise and the bureaucratic state apparatus. Weber understood this process as the institutionalization of purposive-rational economic and administrative action. To the degree that everyday life was affected by this cultural and societal rationalization, traditional forms of life – which in the early modern period were differentiated primarily according to one's trade – were dissolved.

— Jürgen Habermas, Modernity's Consciousness of Time

Whereas in traditional societies such as feudalism governing is managed under the traditional leadership of, for example, a queen or tribal chief, modern societies operate under rational-legal systems. For example, democratic systems attempt to remedy qualitative concerns (such as racial discrimination) with rationalized, quantitative means (for example, civil rights legislation). Weber described the eventual effects of rationalization in his Economy and Society as leading to a "polar night of icy darkness", in which increasing rationalization of human life traps individuals in an "iron cage" (or "steel-hard casing") of rule-based, rational control.

Jürgen Habermas has argued that understanding rationalization properly requires going beyond Weber's notion of rationalization. It requires distinguishing between instrumental rationality, which involves calculation and efficiency (in other words, reducing all relationships to those of means and ends), and communicative rationality, which involves expanding the scope of mutual understanding in communication, the ability to expand this understanding through reflective discourse about communication, and making social and political life subject to this expanded understanding.

It is clear that in The Theory of Communicative Action Weber is playing something like the role that Hegel played for Marx. Weber, for Habermas, must be not so much stood on his head (or put back the right way up) as persuaded to stand on two legs rather than one, to support his theory of modernity with more systematic and structural analyses than those of the (purposive-rational) rationalization of action ... Weber 'parts company with a theory of communicative action' when he defines action in terms of the actor attaching a subjective meaning to it. He does not elucidate "meaning" in connection with the model of speech; he does not relate it to the linguistic medium of possible understanding, but to the beliefs and intentions of an acting subject, taken to being with in isolation. This leads him to his familiar distinction between value-rational, purposive-rational, traditional and affectual action. What Weber should have done instead was to concentrate not on orientations of action but on the general structures of the lifeworld to which acting subjects belong.

— William Outhwaite, Habermas: Key Contemporary Thinkers 1988

=== The Holocaust, modernity and ambivalence ===
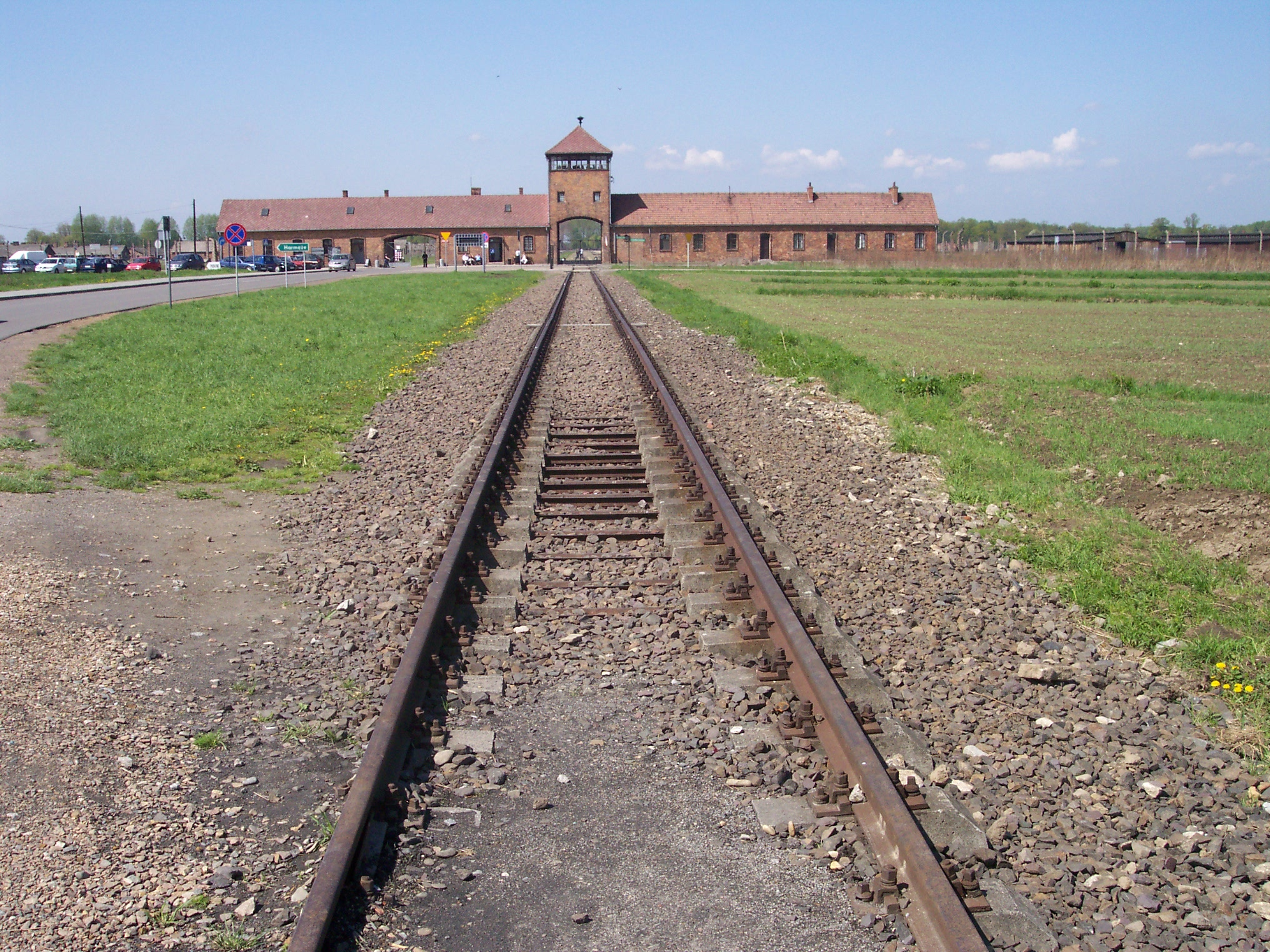
The railway line leading to the death camp at Auschwitz II (Birkenau).

For Zygmunt Bauman, rationalization as a manifestation of modernity may be closely associated with the events of the Holocaust. In Modernity and Ambivalence, Bauman attempted to give an account of the different approaches modern society adopts toward the stranger. He argued that, on the one hand, in a consumer-oriented economy the strange and the unfamiliar is always enticing; in different styles of food, different fashions and in tourism it is possible to experience the allure of what is unfamiliar.

Yet this strange-ness also has a more negative side. The stranger, because he cannot be controlled and ordered, is always the object of fear; he is the potential mugger, the person outside of society's borders who is constantly threatening. Bauman's most famous book, Modernity and the Holocaust, is an attempt to give a full account of the dangers of these kinds of fears. Drawing upon Hannah Arendt and Theodor W. Adorno's books on totalitarianism and the Enlightenment, Bauman argues that the Holocaust should not simply be considered to be an event in Jewish history, nor a regression to pre-modern barbarism. Rather, he says, the Holocaust should be seen as deeply connected to modernity and its order-making efforts. Procedural rationality, the division of labour into smaller and smaller tasks, the taxonomic categorization of different species, and the tendency to view rule-following as morally good all played their role in the Holocaust coming to pass.

For this reason, Bauman argues that modern societies have not fully taken on board the lessons of the Holocaust; it is generally viewed – to use Bauman's metaphor – like a picture hanging on a wall, offering few lessons. In Bauman's analysis, the Jews became 'strangers' par excellence in Europe; the Final Solution was pictured by him as an extreme example of the attempts made by societies to excise the uncomfortable and indeterminate elements existing within them. Bauman, like the philosopher Giorgio Agamben, contended that the same processes of exclusion that were at work in the Holocaust could, and to an extent do, still come into play today.

=== Adorno and Horkheimer's definition of "enlightenment" ===
The term enlightenment is understood to describe the widest sense of thought advancement. When reaching a sense of enlightenment an individual will be liberated of their fears and will be installed within society as 'masters'. This term in the sense of rationalization is seen to refine levels of cogency with formal logic, creating discourse in the framework of being a rational being as it no longer poses the same importance, individuals will want to reach full enlightenment rather than use full rationality. In their analysis of contemporary western society, Dialectic of Enlightenment (1944, revised 1947), Theodor W. Adorno and Max Horkheimer developed a wide and pessimistic concept of enlightenment. In their analysis, enlightenment had its dark side: while trying to abolish superstition and myths by 'foundationalist' philosophy, it ignored its own 'mythical' basis. Its strivings towards totality and certainty led to an increasing instrumentalization of reason. In their view, the enlightenment itself should be enlightened and not posed as a 'myth-free' view of the world. For Marxist philosophy in general, rationalization is closely associated with the concept of "commodity fetishism", for the reason that not only are products designed to fulfill certain tasks, but employees are hired to fulfill specific tasks as well.

== Consumption ==
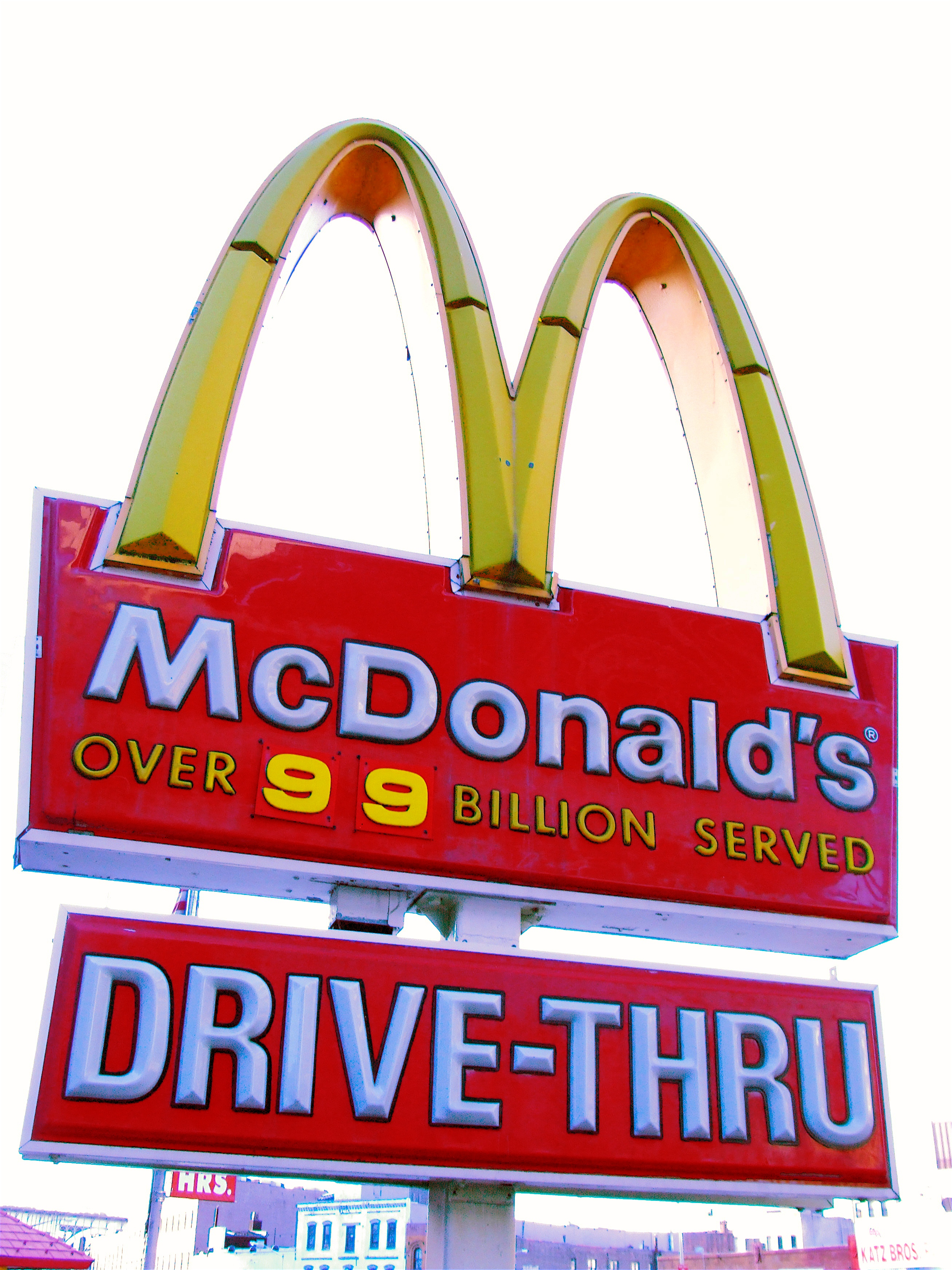
The sign at a McDonald's 'drive-thru'. The "over 99 billion served" statement illustrates Ritzer's idea of calculability.

Modern food consumption typifies the process of rationalization. Where food preparation in traditional societies is more laborious and technically inefficient, modern society has strived towards speed and precision in its delivery. Fast-food restaurants, designed to maximise profit, have strived toward total efficiency since their conception, and continue to do so. A strict level of efficiency has been accomplished in several ways, including stricter control of its workers' actions, the replacement of more complicated systems with simpler, less time-consuming ones, simple numbered systems of value meals and the addition of drive-through windows.

Rationalization is also observable in the replacement of more traditional stores, which may offer subjective advantages to consumers, such as what sociologists consider a less regulated, more natural environment, with modern stores offering the objective advantage of lower prices to consumers. The case of Walmart is one example demonstrating the preferences of the public for lower prices over the advantages sociologists claim for more traditional stores.

The sociologist George Ritzer has used the term McDonaldization to refer, not just to the actions of the fast food restaurant, but to the general process of rationalization. Ritzer distinguishes four primary components of McDonaldization:

- Efficiency – the optimal method for accomplishing a task; the fastest method to get from point A to point B. Efficiency in McDonaldization means that every aspect of the organization is geared toward the minimization of time.
- Calculability – goals are quantifiable (i.e., sales, money) rather than subjective (i.e., taste, labour). McDonaldization developed the notion that quantity equals quality, and that a large amount of product delivered to the customer in a short amount of time is the same as a high quality product. "They run their organization in such a way that a person can walk into any McDonald's and receive the same sandwiches prepared in precisely the same way. This results in a highly rational system that specifies every action and leaves nothing to chance".
- Predictability – standardized and uniform services. "Predictability" means that no matter where a person goes, they will receive the same service and receive the same product at every interaction with the corporation. This also applies to the workers in those organizations; their tasks are highly repetitive and predictable routines.
- Control – standardized and uniform employees, replacement of human by non-human technologies.

== Further objects of rationalization ==
One rational tendency is towards increasing the efficiency and output of the human body. Several means can be employed in reaching this end, including trends towards regular exercise, dieting, increased hygiene, drugs, and an emphasis on optimal nutrition. As well as increasing lifespans, these allow for stronger, leaner, more optimized bodies for quickly performing tasks.

== See also ==
- Conformity – Matching opinions and behaviors to group norms
- Consumerism – Acquisition of goods beyond essential needs
- Disenchantment – Cultural rationalization and devaluation of religion
- Justice#Fairness – Concept of moral fairness and administration of the law
- Just-world fallacy – Idea that everyone faces consequence as they deserve
- Knowledge economy – Approach to generating value
- Legitimating ideology
- Might makes right – View that morality is, or ought to be, determined by those in power
- Postmodernity – Societal state after modernity
- Reductionism – Philosophical view explaining systems in terms of smaller parts
- Urbanization – Process of population movement to cities
- McDonaldization – Sociological concept
