= Journal of Consumer Culture =

- Discipline: Sociology
- Language: English
- Edited by: Steven Miles

Publication details
- History: 2001-present
- Publisher: SAGE Publications
- Frequency: Triannually
- Impact factor: 3.579 (2016)

Standard abbreviations
- ISO 4: J. Consum. Cult.

Indexing
- ISSN: 1741-2900 (print); 1741-2900 (web)
- LCCN: 2002200176
- OCLC no.: 47766580

Links
- Journal homepage; Online access; Online archive

Journal of Consumer Culture is a peer-reviewed academic journal that covers the field of sociology, marketing research, and specifically research on consumer research and consumer culture. The journal's editor-in-chief is Steven Miles. It was established in 2001 and is currently published by SAGE Publications.

== Abstracting and indexing ==
Journal of Consumer Culture is abstracted and indexed in Scopus and the Social Sciences Citation Index. According to the Journal Citation Reports, its 2019 impact factor is 1.670.
