= Predictability =

Degree to which a correct prediction of a system's state can be made

Predictability is the degree to which a correct prediction or forecast of a system's state can be made, either qualitatively or quantitatively.

== Predictability and causality ==
Causal determinism has a strong relationship with predictability. Perfect predictability implies strict determinism, but lack of predictability does not necessarily imply lack of determinism. Limitations on predictability could be caused by factors such as a lack of information or excessive complexity.

In experimental physics, there are always observational errors determining variables such as positions and velocities. So perfect prediction is practically impossible. Moreover, in modern quantum mechanics, Werner Heisenberg's indeterminacy principle puts limits on the accuracy with which such quantities can be known. So such perfect predictability is also theoretically impossible.

=== Laplace's demon ===
Laplace's demon is a supreme intelligence who could completely predict the one possible future given the Newtonian dynamical laws of classical physics and perfect knowledge of the positions and velocities of all the particles in the world. In other words, if it were possible to have every piece of data on every atom in the universe from the beginning of time, it would be possible to predict the behavior of every atom into the future. Laplace's determinism is usually thought to be based on his mechanics, but he could not prove mathematically that mechanics is deterministic. Rather, his determinism is based on general philosophical principles, specifically on the principle of sufficient reason and the law of continuity.

== In statistical physics ==
Although the second law of thermodynamics can determine the equilibrium state that a system will evolve to, and steady states in dissipative systems can sometimes be predicted, there exists no general rule to predict the time evolution of systems distanced from equilibrium, e.g. chaotic systems, if they do not approach an equilibrium state. Their predictability usually deteriorates with time and to quantify predictability, the rate of divergence of system trajectories in phase space can be measured (Kolmogorov–Sinai entropy, Lyapunov exponents).

== In mathematics ==
In stochastic analysis a random process is a predictable process if it is possible to know the next state from the present time.

The branch of mathematics known as Chaos Theory focuses on the behavior of systems that are highly sensitive to initial conditions. It suggests that a small change in an initial condition can completely alter the progression of a system. This phenomenon is known as the butterfly effect, which claims that a butterfly flapping its wings in Brazil can cause a tornado in Texas. The nature of chaos theory suggests that the predictability of any system is limited because it is impossible to know all of the minutiae of a system at the present time. In principle, the deterministic systems that chaos theory attempts to analyze can be predicted, but uncertainty in a forecast increases exponentially with elapsed time.

As documented in, three major kinds of butterfly effects within Lorenz studies include: the sensitive dependence on initial conditions, the ability of a tiny perturbation to create an organized circulation at large distances, and the hypothetical role of small-scale processes in contributing to finite predictability. The three kinds of butterfly effects are not exactly the same.

== In human–computer interaction ==
In the study of human–computer interaction, predictability is the property to forecast the consequences of a user action given the current state of the system.

A contemporary example of human-computer interaction manifests in the development of computer vision algorithms for collision-avoidance software in self-driving cars. Researchers at NVIDIA Corporation, Princeton University, and other institutions are leveraging deep learning to teach computers to anticipate subsequent road scenarios based on visual information about current and previous states.

Another example of human-computer interaction are computer simulations meant to predict human behavior based on algorithms. For example, MIT has recently developed an incredibly accurate algorithm to predict the behavior of humans. When tested against television shows, the algorithm was able to predict with great accuracy the subsequent actions of characters. Algorithms and computer simulations like these show great promise for the future of artificial intelligence.

== In human sentence processing ==
Linguistic prediction is a phenomenon in psycholinguistics occurring whenever information about a word or other linguistic unit is activated before that unit is actually encountered. Evidence from eyetracking, event-related potentials, and other experimental methods indicates that in addition to integrating each subsequent word into the context formed by previously encountered words, language users may, under certain conditions, try to predict upcoming words. Predictability has been shown to affect both text and speech processing, as well as speech production. Further, predictability has been shown to have an effect on syntactic, semantic and pragmatic comprehension.

== In biology ==
In the study of biology – particularly genetics and neuroscience – predictability relates to the prediction of biological developments and behaviors based on inherited genes and past experiences.

Significant debate exists in the scientific community over whether or not a person's behavior is completely predictable based on their genetics. Studies such as the one in Israel, which showed that judges were more likely to give a lighter sentence if they had eaten more recently. In addition to cases like this, it has been proven that individuals smell better to someone with complementary immunity genes, leading to more physical attraction. Genetics can be examined to determine if an individual is predisposed to any diseases, and behavioral disorders can most often be explained by analyzing defects in genetic code. Scientist who focus on examples like these argue that human behavior is entirely predictable. Those on the other side of the debate argue that genetics can only provide a predisposition to act a certain way and that, ultimately, humans possess the free will to choose whether or not to act.

Animals have significantly more predictable behavior than humans. Driven by natural selection, animals develop mating calls, predator warnings, and communicative dances. One example of these engrained behaviors is the Belding's ground squirrel, which developed a specific set of calls that warn nearby squirrels about predators. If a ground squirrel sees a predator on land it will elicit a trill after it gets to safety, which signals to nearby squirrels that they should stand up on their hind legs and attempt to locate the predator. When a predator is seen in the air, a ground squirrel will immediately call out a long whistle, putting himself in danger but signaling for nearby squirrels to run for cover. Through experimentation and examination scientists have been able to chart behaviors like this and very accurately predict how animals behave in certain situations.

== In popular culture ==
The study of predictability often sparks debate between those who believe humans maintain complete control over their free-will and those who believe our actions are predetermined. However, it is likely that neither Newton nor Laplace saw the study of predictability as relating to determinism.

== In weather and climate ==
As climate change and other weather phenomenon become more common, the predictability of climate systems becomes more important. The IPCC notes that our ability to predict future detailed climate interactions is difficult, however, long term climate forecasts are possible.

=== The dual nature with distinct predictability ===
Over 50 years since Lorenz's 1963 study and a follow-up presentation in 1972, the statement “weather is chaotic” has been well accepted. Such a view turns our attention from regularity associated with Laplace's view of determinism to irregularity associated with chaos. In contrast to single-type chaotic solutions, recent studies using a generalized Lorenz model have focused on the coexistence of chaotic and regular solutions that appear within the same model using the same modeling configurations but different initial conditions. The results, with attractor coexistence, suggest that the entirety of weather possesses a dual nature of chaos and order with distinct predictability.

Using a slowly varying, periodic heating parameter within a generalized Lorenz model, Shen and his co-authors suggested a revised view: “The atmosphere possesses chaos and order; it includes, as examples, emerging organized systems (such as tornadoes) and time varying forcing from recurrent seasons”.

=== Spring predictability barrier ===
The spring predictability barrier refers to a period of time early in the year when making summer weather predictions about the El Niño–Southern Oscillation is difficult. It is unknown why it is difficult, although many theories have been proposed. There is some thought that the cause is due to the ENSO transition where conditions are more rapidly shifting.

== In macroeconomics ==
Predictability in macroeconomics refers most frequently to the degree to which an economic model accurately reflects quarterly data and the degree to which one might successfully identify the internal propagation mechanisms of models. Examples of US macroeconomic series of interest include but are not limited to Consumption, Investment, Real GNP, and Capital Stock. Factors that are involved in the predictability of an economic system include the range of the forecast (is the forecast two years "out" or twenty) and the variability of estimates. Mathematical processes for assessing the predictability of macroeconomic trends are still in development.

== See also ==
- Contingency
- Forecasting
- Improvisation
- Randomness
