= Holiday Beanie Babies =

Stuffed toy line

Holidays were a common theme of Ty Beanie Babies. For some holidays, a special Beanie Baby has been produced every year.

== Christmas ==
Each year since 1997, Ty has produced one or more annual Christmas teddy bears that have been introduced some time early in the fall of that year, and retired by the end of the same year.

The first Christmas bear was made in 1997, and it was simply called "1997 Teddy." Its design was that of Brown Teddy with a red and white hat and scarf. In each subsequent year, the Christmas bear that was produced was called "(year) Holiday Teddy." The designs varied each year, and in some years, multiple versions of the design were made. Today, Ty's website calls this one "1997 Holiday Teddy."

The 1998 Holiday Teddy, differed substantially from that of 1997. It had red and green designs on a white background and was the first Beanie Baby to have a device producing an audible sound inside (which was a bell).

The 1999 Holiday Teddy was unlike either of the above. It had fabric with a light blue background with a snowflake pattern.

The 2000 Holiday Teddy was even more different. It was solid white with a red scarf, and was in a new style of bears.

The 2001 Holiday Teddy was more simple-looking than its predecessors, being solid, fuzzy green.

The 2002 Holiday Teddy was also solid green like that of 2001, but it was made with a hat that had reindeer-like antlers. It retired at a much earlier date than previous ones - in early November.

The 2003 Holiday Teddy looked very similar to the 1997 Teddy, but with a green scarf.

The 2004 Holiday Teddy came in a different shape than earlier holiday teddies. It was white with a red bow instead of a scarf.

The 2005 Holiday Teddy was like none other ever seen before. It had a dog-like face, very thick light brown fur, and it was holding a big red flower.

The 2006 Holiday Teddy was the first holiday teddy to be made in bright red. It was holding a green wreath.

The 2007 Holiday Teddy was the first holiday teddy to be produced in two different styles. Red and green versions were made with candy cane stripes.

The 2008 Holiday Teddy was much like the 1997 Teddy, but was darker brown with a red, green, and white striped scarf.

== Hanukkah ==
In 2005, Ty introduced a bear called Happy Hanukkah. Two versions were made: one with a dreidel and one with a menorah. While the one with the menorah was available in retail stores, the one with the dreidel had to be purchased online.

== New Year's Day ==
In 2005, the first bear in honor of New Year's Day, called New Year was introduced. In each subsequent year, a bear called "New Year" followed by the upcoming year has been introduced (2007 and 2008).

Some viewed Millennium and Ty2K as New Year's bears in honor of New Year's Day 2000.

=== Countdown ===
Countdown was the Beanie Baby for New Years Day 2005. There were three versions made, which were known as 10-9-8, 7-6-5-4, and 3-2-1. The 3-2-1 version was believed by many to be the rarest.

== Valentine's Day ==
The first bear in honor of Valentine's Day was Valentino. It was followed up by reverse-color Valentina. Several other Valentine's bears have been introduced since, including Smooch.

== St. Patrick's Day ==
The first St. Patrick's Day bear introduced was Erin. Erin was also seen as an international bear representing Ireland, though it was not exclusive to Ireland.

== April Fool's Day ==
April Fool was introduced on February 26, 2007, as the first beanie to represent April Fool's Day. It was retired July 14 of the same year. Occasionally, the words "April Fool" on the hang tag appeared upside-down, but this was reported only to be a production error.

== Father's Day ==
Various beanies have been made in honor of Father's Day.

- The first Father's Day Beanie was a teddy bear named Dad-e in 2002. It could only be ordered online.
- Dad-e was followed up with Dad-e 2003 and Dad-e 2004 in those respective years.
- In 2005, Dad was produced. Both a retail and a TyStore version each were made, in which the colors of the letters spelling out "DAD" varied.
- In 2006, Dad 2006 was made, reading "Dad Rocks" on its feet.
- In 2007, other animals were made in honor of Father's Day. These included a bulldog named Dad 2007, a lion named My Dad, and a monkey named #1 Dad.

== Memorial Bears ==
Several Beanies were made in memory of deceased persons. In some cases, profits were donated to various charities.

=== Garcia ===
Garcia, a Ty-dyed bear, is believed to have been made in honor of Jerry Garcia the leader of the rock group, The Grateful Dead. It is also believed to be the predecessor to the Peace the Bear, which had an identical design, except for a peace symbol embroidered on the fabric.

=== Princess ===
Princess the Bear was a Beanie Baby bear that was made in the memory of Princess Diana, who was killed on August 31, 1997.

Ty, Inc. announced the release of the collectible on October 29, 1997. Its purpose was to raise money for Diana's favorite charities. Originally, only 12 units were shipped to each authorized Ty retailer. At this time, these were purchased quickly and sold on the second-hand market for hundreds of dollars apiece. But within months, they were shipped en masse, the market became flooded with them, and they were easy to find at retail prices.

The Princess Beanie Baby was retired on April 13, 1999, and shortly thereafter, a Princess Beanie Buddy was announced.

=== Ariel ===
Ariel, a bear, was made in memory of Ariel Glaser, the daughter of Starsky and Hutch star Paul Michael Glaser and his wife Elizabeth Glaser. Both Ariel and her mother contracted HIV and died from AIDS. This Beanie Baby was made order to raise funds for the Elizabeth Glaser Pediatric AIDS Foundation. The symbol on Ariel's chest is based on a painting the real Ariel did, which also serves as the Foundations logo.

== Signature bears ==
Since 1999, Ty has produced an annual signature bear named "(year) Signature Bear." These have featured Ty Warner's signature either on a heart, printed throughout the fabric, or a combination of both, and have varied in color each year.

== Teddy the bear ==
Teddy the bear was the first Beanie Baby to sit-up like a teddy bear. Teddy was produced in six colors: brown, cranberry, jade, violet, teal, and magenta. Teddy's face underwent a considerable change in the summer of 1995, as the "new face" design replaced the "old face" versions of the bears. Teddy brown was the only version of Teddy kept in the current line as 1996 came around - he later retired in October 1997. The shape of "new face" Teddy later became the standard style for many other Beanie Baby teddy bears with a variety of themes.

A special variation of Teddy violet (new face) was used as an employee gift in 1997.

There were several Beanie Buddy versions of Teddy that were produced, including New-face Cranberry Teddy as one of The Original Nine Beanie Buddies, Old-face Teal Teddy, and the violet Employee Bear.

During the height of the beanie baby craze, some versions of Teddy sold on the second-hand market for around $2000.

== Beanies representing months ==
In 2001, a series of birthday-themed bears with the name of month were produced. These were mostly made available during their respective months.

In 2002, a follow-up of each bear was made with the name of the month, followed by the number 2 (January 2, February 2, etc.).
