= Geographic Beanie Babies =

Geographic Beanie Babies refers to Beanie Baby dolls that were made exclusively for retail sale in the country they represented. The collection consists of approximately 50 named dolls representing 10 countries on 4 continents. The dolls can now be found on the secondary market outside their original country.

== North America ==
=== Canada ===
==== Maple ====
Maple the Bear was the first Beanie Baby bear that was made in honor of Canada, and was sold exclusively in Canada. Introduced on January 1, 1997, Maple was the first beanie baby to be exclusive to a country other than the United States. The original intention of Ty was to name Maple "Pride," but due to confusion involving "Pride of America", the name was changed, though not before the first 10,000 (originally thought to be 3000) Maples have tush tags with Pride on the label.

Maple was retired in the summer of 1999, and soon after, a Beanie Buddy version was produced.

In the spring of 1999, a Teenie Beanie version of Maple was offered in a promotion by McDonald's. This was the only version that was retailed in the United States.

==== Other Canadian exclusives ====
- Chinook was the first Canadian exclusive to follow up Maple. It was introduced in May 2000, but unlike Maple, it was only produced for three months until its retirement.
- Canada was introduced in October 2004 and retired in May 2005. A key-clip version was introduced in 2006 and retired in 2007.
- Courageous, Courageously, and Courageousness were all introduced in 2006 as Canada exclusives. Two versions of each were made: one for the regular marketplace, and one for the Special Olympics.

==== Provinces ====
The following beanies were made in honor of various Canadian provinces:

- British Columbia Pacific Dogwood the Bear

=== United States ===
==== Patriotic ====
===== America =====
America the bear was introduced on March 22, 2002. This beanie's purpose was to raise money for the American Red Cross to aid victims of the September 11 attacks. Six versions of America were produced in a total of three colors prior to its retirement on April 3, 2002. Beanie Buddy versions of each color were also produced.

===== American Blessing =====
American Blessing was introduced on April 29, 2005, and was made in a fabric style similar to many other patriotic beanies, but in a "kneeling" style similar to beanies like Hope. American Blessing retired on December 29, 2005.

==== U.S. states ====
Beanie Baby bears have been named after the following U.S. states: Alabama, Arizona, California, Connecticut, Florida, Georgia, Hawaii, Illinois, Kansas, Louisiana, Massachusetts, Minnesota, Mississippi, New Jersey, New York, Ohio, Pennsylvania, South Carolina, Tennessee, Texas, Washington, and Wisconsin. Some of these have been exclusively sold in their respective states.

- Alabama, Mississippi, and Louisiana were Hurricane Katrina fundraisers

==== U.S. cities ====
- Aces the Bear was a Las Vegas exclusive
- Atlanta the Bear was exclusively made available to those who attended the Atlanta toy show of July 2004
- Boston the Bear (offered in 2004) was a celebration of the city of Boston
- Chicago the Bear (offered in 2004) was a celebration of the city of Chicago

== Europe ==
=== Germany ===
Germania

=== Italy ===
Basilico (made briefly in 2006) was a bear representing Italy, though it was exclusive throughout Europe

=== United Kingdom ===
==== Britannia ====
Britannia was the first Beanie Baby to represent United Kingdom to be made by Ty, introduced at the end of 1997. Britannia was made available to retailers in the United Kingdom only, and was heavily sought by collectors elsewhere, though it was difficult to find in the hands of a retailer, even within the United Kingdom. Two versions were made: One with a patch flag that came from Indonesia, and one with an embroidered flag, that came from China. The patch flag version was discontinued early on in favor of the embroidered flag version due to concerns over quality and counterfeiting.

In the spring of 1999, a Teenie Beanie version of Britannia was made to be offered by McDonald's, and was available even in the United States. This was the only version of Britannia that was retailed outside the UK.

In early 2000, a Beanie Buddy version of Britannia was made, and it was likewise exclusive to the UK.

==== Buckingham ====
Buckingham, named after Buckingham Palace, was introduced in 2000 as a follow-up to Britannia. A buddy of Buckingham was also made later, which stated that Buckingham was one of only a few bears to have two ribbons.

==== Erin ====
Erin, named for an Anglicized version of a Gaelic name, represents Ireland (though not exclusive to Ireland) and St. Patrick's Day - see also Holiday Beanie Babies. There is also a Teenie Beanie version.

== Asia-Pacific ==
=== Australia ===
Australia was one of six Asia-Pacific region countries, which had their respective bears generally released in a series.

=== Japan ===
- Sakura
- Ai
- Nipponia

=== Korea ===
- Coreana (10/02-4/03)

=== Malaysia ===
==== Bunga Raya ====
Bunga Raya the bear was made as a set of six Asia-Pacific beanies introduced in 2002 to be exclusive to their respective countries. The name Bunga Raya is the name of the country's national flower, which in English is known as hibiscus. This flower has played an important role in Malaysian culture for centuries.

==== Cinta ====
Bunga Raya was followed up with Cinta, a flower-patterned bear. Cinta was introduced in 2004, and was produced for more than two years before its 2006 retirement.

=== New Zealand ===
==== Aotearoa ====
Aotearoa the flag-printed bear was introduced on September 12, 2005, as part of a series of six Asia-Pacific bears all exclusive to their countries. The name "Aotearoa" is the most widely known and accepted Māori name for New Zealand. Aotearoa retired on June 15, 2006.
