= Lina Trivedi =

American entrepreneur, author, and educator (born 1973)

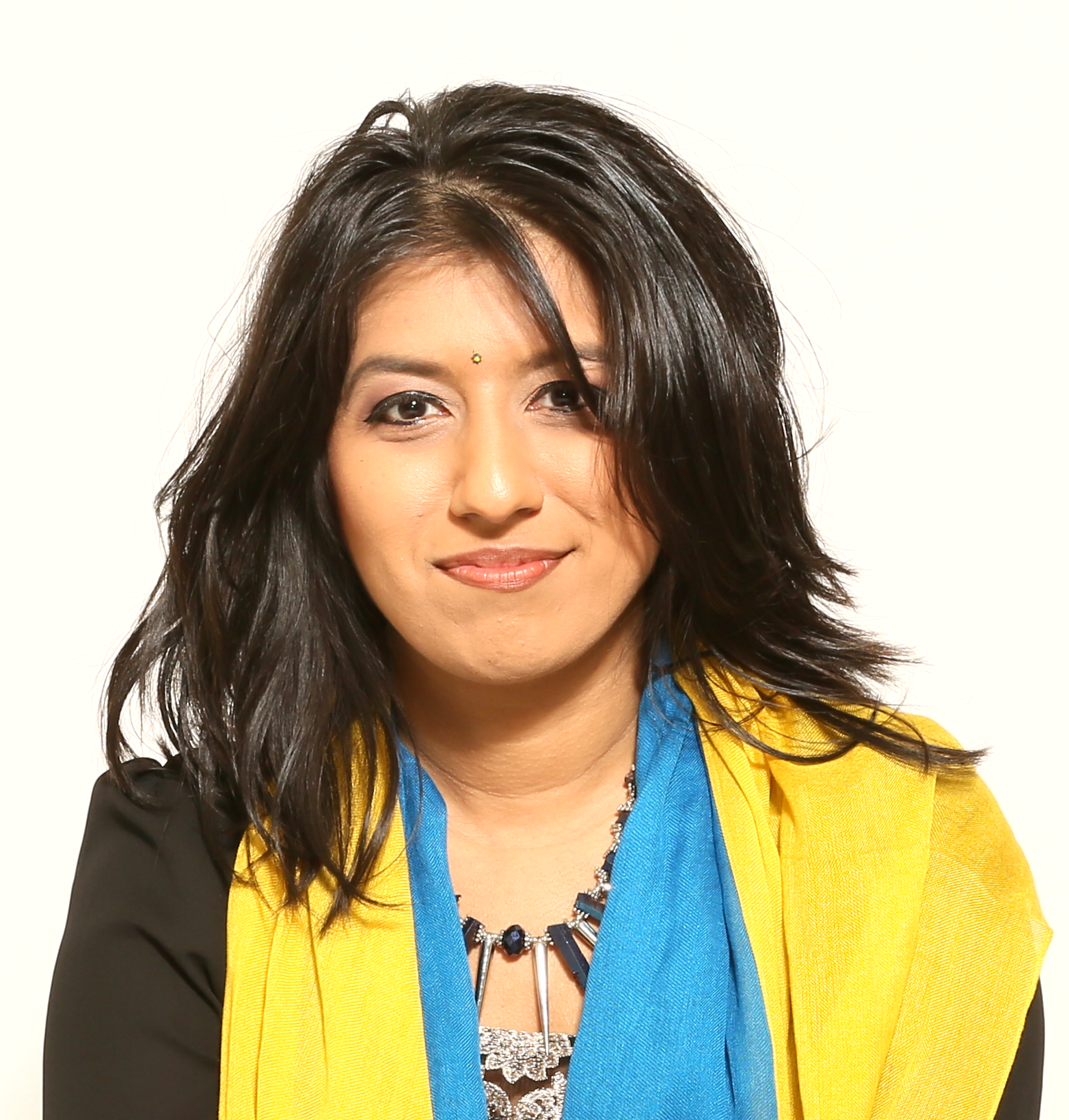
- Born: June 11, 1973 (age 52); Chicago, Illinois, U.S.
- Education: DePaul University
- Occupations: Entrepreneur; publisher; author
- Known for: Beanie Babies web site, Beanie Babies poems
- Notable work: WordBotic

Lina Trivedi (born June 11, 1973) is an American entrepreneur, author, educator and civil servant.

Her most noted writing credit is for authoring the first 136 poems of Beanie Babies. She is also credited for directing the world's first business to consumer Web site, which she did for Ty Inc., manufacturer of Beanie Babies. She is referred to as the woman who gave birth to the Internet and invented E-commerce. In effect, Beanie Babies evolved to become the world's first Internet sensation and Ty Warner became a billionaire.

== Early life ==
Lina Trivedi is an Indian American who was born to a Gujarati-speaking Brahmin family in Chicago, Illinois. She lived in Addison, Illinois for most of her school-age and young-adult life. She attended DePaul University majoring in Sociology and it was during this time that her career at Ty, Inc. began.

She was raised by entrepreneurial parents who cultivated her skills at computer programming at a very young age. In the early 1980s, Trivedi's family purchased an IBM Personal Computer 5150 and at 7 years old, Trivedi's mother made Lina read the PC DOS 1.0 manual three times. In second grade, Trivedi was writing simple computer programs in BASIC.

== Career at Ty Inc. ==
In 1992, Trivedi became Ty, Inc.'s 12th employee. In 1995, Beanie Babies were escalating as a pop culture craze throughout the world. In early 1995, Trivedi approached Ty Warner, then president of Ty, Inc., and shared her thoughts that the product hang tags were boring, and that unique birthdays and poems on the inside of the heart-shaped tags would make the items more collectible and interesting. She shared an example poem that she wrote for Stripes the Tiger, which ended up having Trivedi's birthday. Warner assigned her the task of writing all the Beanie Babies poems and designing the inside of more than 100 product tags.

Later in 1995, Trivedi approached Warner to talk about a new development that existed on college campuses called the internet. She indicated that the Internet was primarily a research tool, however college students were starting to make personal websites, and she thought creating a website for Beanie Babies could present a unique opportunity to engage the consumer market. She brought her 14.4k modem from DePaul University where she was enrolled as a student and demonstrated how the Internet works. Warner was intrigued and he gave Trivedi free license to create a Web site using her judgment and skills. By the time the first iteration of the Ty website was published in late 1995, only 1.4% of Americans were using the internet.

The Beanie Babies Web site that Trivedi created was the first business to consumer web site designed to bridge the gap between business and consumers. The web site contained innovative features, such as the ability to vote for a Beanie Baby that managed a blog on the official site that contained multiple entries per day. There was also a trading post, featured fan mail and a list of 101 things to do with a Beanie Baby. The Beanie Babies web site was receiving over 1 billion visits per year and Trivedi is credited with cultivating the demand of Beanie Babies through the Internet. In 1996, Trivedi coordinated three private Boeing 747s to bring Beanie Babies to American retail locations in time for Easter.

The snowball effect of the Beanie Babies craze and the rise of the Internet was not foreseen in advance. Although Ty, Inc. was very private about their sales figures related to Beanie Babies, Trivedi was quoted as saying that "sales were overwhelming." Trivedi also played a vital role in the design of Beanie Babies, as well as the new and retiring characters as they were announced. As part of her campaign to engage audiences, she coordinated fans to guide the creation of the 100th Beanie Baby character through the Internet in 1996.

Beanie Babies grew in popularity quicker than any other phenomenon prior to its time due to the instant nature of the Internet. Trivedi produced all the announcements on the official Beanie Babies Website. Many were buying and then trading these toys online on the official Beanie Babies Website, as well as independent sites, for hundreds of dollars and building collections of toys that were exceeding $100,000 in value. At the height of the Beanie Babies craze, 10% of all eBay sales were transactions related to Beanie Babies.

== Media appearances and contributions ==
Trivedi has appeared in the following media:

| Year | Media Title | Media Details |
|---|---|---|
| 2021 | Dark Side of the 90s | Season 1, Episode 4, "Beanie Babies Go Bust" |
| 2021 | Beanie Mania | HBO Max (streaming service) |
| 2022 | Beanie Bubble (Documentary) | Produced by: The Nacelle Company and Whiskey Bear |
| 2023 | Rewind the 90's | National Geographic / Disney+: Season 1, Episode 5, "Mass Appeal" |

In 2023, Trivedi has also been fictionalized in The Beanie Bubble, directed by Kristin Gore and Damian Kulash, as the character "Maya Kumar", played by Geraldine Viswanathan. In the film, Maya lands a temp job working for Ty Warner at Ty, Inc., where she proceeded to take the Beanie Babies craze millions to billions by spawning a multi-million-dollar collector's market online through eBay.

She was portrayed as the first person to build a website for commercial purposes, as well as writing all the poems on the inside of Beanie Babies tags. The movie ended with her walking out of her job after being denied a raise that aligned with her contributions to the company. According to the movie, Trivedi's character, Maya Kumar, was referenced as Ty's secret weapon and was offered "20 smackeroos per hour" and she told Ty Warner, "I'm not your secret weapon. I'm not a secret, and I'm not yours. I quit."

== Books ==
Trivedi is the author of the following books:

| Year | Title | Note |
|---|---|---|
| 2015 | Lessons Learned as a Special Needs Mom | Blue Lotus Publishing |
| 2012 | 11 Rules for Efficiency | Blue Lotus Publishing |
| 2011 | 9 Catastrophic Mistakes in Business | Blue Lotus Publishing |

== Political and social career ==
In 2004, Trivedi worked for the Urban League where she worked on the Workforce and Economic Development Team to help individuals transition from disadvantaged backgrounds into the job market. In this position, she developed a concept of job fulfillment in the private sector called "Alternative Selection" which is an alternative to Affirmative Action that allows employers to develop pools of candidates based on economic disadvantage, rather than race. Madison Gas and Electric was one of the first businesses to adopt such employment methods in 2008.

Trivedi had been appointed to two public service positions in Madison, Wisconsin. She served as the Minority Representative in the Community Services Commission and on the Community Development Block Grant Commission from 2005 to 2008.

== Technology career ==
In the midst of the Beanie Babies phenomenon, Trivedi worked closely with the Children's Advertising Review Unit to help build standards that relate to children's web sites in an effort to establish voluntary regulations designed to protect the privacy of children on the Internet. After her career at Ty, she promoted these regulations among other companies that promoted products to children on the internet, and spearheaded changes to the web sites of Chicago International Children's Film Festival and the Spice Girls to adhere to these privacy regulations.

Trivedi transcended from her career with Beanie Babies and started her own web design firm in 1997 where she developed the first web sites for many notable entities, including the Sears Tower, Spice Girls and Mötley Crüe. Her innovations included broadcasting snapshots of the Chicago skyline from the top of the Sears Tower through their web site.

Trivedi's design firm was named one of the top design firms in Chicago by Crain's Chicago Business in 1998. Trivedi was also named one of the top 30 local talents in 1999 by the Chicago Sun-Times. Then in 2000, the Chicago Sun-Times named Trivedi one of the top 30 Chicago area entrepreneurs under the age of 30.

While leading her web design firm, Trivedi also participated on a team of technology and finance professionals that produced the world's first realtime processing credit card application. This technology was first launched on Citigroup credit card products, including the Shell Credit Card, Texaco Credit Card and several student credit card brands that were operated by Citigroup.

In 2013, Trivedi began developing publishing software designed to help people write content used to publish books and web sites. Her most notable technology inventions include a patent pending artificial intelligence that can write. According to NBC, her inventions have been used to enable people to become authors by "taking the mechanics out of publishing so that writers can focus on the messages they are trying to convey". The artificial intelligence she invented was later referenced as the predecessor to ChatGPT.

Today, Trivedi is developing artificial intelligence with her new start-up company called Joii.ai.

== Personal life ==
Trivedi currently lives in Beaver Dam, Wisconsin, where she is a single mother to a child with special needs. Trivedi's daughter was diagnosed with Goltz syndrome at birth. Fewer than 25 people in the United States are reported to have Goltz syndrome. As a result of the syndrome, Trivedi's daughter was born without a leg, missing fingers, and lacked muscles on one side of her face. To date, Trivedi's daughter has been through over 25 surgeries before the age of 5. She is also the youngest child in the United States to receive a prosthetic leg at 7 months old.

According to her book, living life as a special needs mother puts the world into perspective and Trivedi has channeled her talents and business acumen to cultivate a sense of business and entrepreneurship within her young daughter, Nikhita. Before entering 3rd grade, Trivedi's daughter has been established as the President of a Wyoming Corporation that designs and sells bows through a business modeled after the enterprise run by Minnie Mouse in the TV series Mickey Mouse Clubhouse.
