= Pillow Pal =

Stuffed toy line

Pillow Pals were a line of plush toys made by Ty, Inc. Pillow Pals were introduced in 1993. The toys were given their name because they were soft like a pillow, and were made with children in mind. Though many of them resembled certain Beanie Babies, they did not share names with their Beanie Baby counterparts. Such Pillow Pals saw a decline in popularity in the late 1990s with the introduction of Beanie Buddies, which were also larger versions of various Beanie Babies. In January 1999, all Pillow Pals were redesigned, and their colors were changed. This line did not sell well, and was discontinued by Ty around the end of the year.

At the time of the final retirement, Ty donated its remaining stock of pillow pals to the Ronald McDonald House to be distributed to sick children.

== List of Pillow Pals ==
The following Pillow Pals were made during the 1990s:

Name	Animal Type	Introduced	Reintroduced	Retired	Beanie Baby Resembled
Antlers	Moose		1999 (neon)	1999	Chocolate
Baba	Lamb		1999 (neon)	1999	Fleece
Bruiser	Bulldog	1997			Wrinkles
Carrots	Bunny		1999 (neon)	1999	Ears, but pink instead of brown
Chewy	Beaver		1999 (neon)	1999	
Clover	Bunny	1998			Ears, but white instead of brown
Foxy	Fox				Sly
Glide	Porpoise				A dolphin
Huggy	Bear	1995	1999 (neon)	1999	Cubbie, but yellow instead of brown
Meow	Cat	1997	1999 (neon)	1999	Snip
Moo	Cow	1995			Daisy, but with white body instead of black
Oink	Pig	1995			Squealer
Paddles	Platypus		1999 (neon)	1999	Patti
Purr	Tiger				Stripes, but yellow-orange instead of orange-black
Red	Bull				Snort
Ribbit (All-Green)	Frog	1995	1999 (neon)	1999	Legs
Ribbit (Green-Yellow)	Frog				Smoochy
Sherbert	Tie-Dye Bear	1998	1999 (neon)	1999	Sammy
Snap (All-Yellow)	Turtle	1995			Speedy, but yellow instead of green
Snap (Yellow-Green)	Turtle		1999 (neon)		Peekaboo
Snuggy	Bear	1995			Cubbie, but pink instead of brown
Sparkler	Bear			1999	Spangle
Speckles	Leopard				Freckles
Spotty	Dalmatian				Dotty
Squirt	Elephant		1999 (neon)	1999	Peanut
Swinger	Monkey		1999 (neon)	1999	Bongo
Tide	Whale				Splash
Tubby	Hippopotamus				Happy
Woof	Dog	1995	1999 (neon)	1999	Bones
Zulu	Zebra				Ziggy, but pink-green instead of black-white

After the 1999 redesign, the following Pillow Pals were made:

Name	Animal Type	Difference from original
Baba	Lamb	Purple rather than white
Bibbit	Frog	New introduction in 1999
Huggy	Bear	New introduction in 1999
Carrots	Bunny	Green rather than pink
Kolala	Koala	New introduction in 1999
Meow	Cat	Purple rather than tan
Paddles	Platypus	Green rather than purple
Rusty	Raccoon	New introduction in 1999
Snap	Turtle	Tie-dyed rather than green
Squirt	Elephant	Turquoise rather than light blue
Swinger	Monkey	Blue and yellow rather than brown
Woof	Dog	Multicolored rather than brown
