= Clubby =

Beanie Baby

Clubby was a Beanie Baby that was available in 1998 exclusively by mail order to those who joined the Beanie Babies Official Club by purchasing a kit. It was followed up in later years by other bears also named "Clubby" followed by a Roman numeral. In all, a total of ten styles of bears, named Clubby, Clubby II, Clubby III, Clubby IV, Clubby V, Clubby VI (three versions - rainbow colored teddy bear, blue potbelly style bear, and matching purple potbelly style bear), Clubby VII and Clubby VIII. In addition, larger sized Beanie Buddies of Clubby, Clubby II, Clubby III, Clubby IV, Clubby V and Clubby VI (an amalgamation of the three Beanie Baby versions) were produced. A four pack box set of Jingle Beanies (Christmas ornament sized Beanie Babies) containing Clubby, Clubby II, Clubby III and Clubby IV was also released. Although the Clubby bears were not rare, they often proved elusive for people who weren't enrolled in the club, who were forced to search for them on the secondary market or through the Ty Store.

The first of the series, Clubby I, simply known as Clubby, came out in 1998. The bear could be obtained through the purchase of a BBOC kit for about $5, followed by mailing in a membership application form, along with about $10 for the cost of the bear itself plus shipping. While the offer was made, there was a heavy demand for the collectible, and many orders came long past when they were promised as the volume overwhelmed production and fulfillment capabilities, leading many consumers to grow frustrated and become disenchanted with the club. The Federal Trade Commission issued a $216,000 fine against the company.

== Clubby II ==
Clubby II Beanie Baby and Beanie Buddy

Clubby II came out in 1999. In order to settle complaints from customers during the previous year about delayed shipments, Clubby II was sold within the kit that was found in stores for about $20, which also included a coin, a checklist, a set of Ty trading cards, and other Beanie items. The "carrying case" for the kit (which was designed to double as a Beanie Baby display case) was made entirely out of PVC, which is known to damage fabric over time.

== Clubby Buddies ==
Later in 1999, Clubby and Clubby II Beanie Buddies became available to BBOC members by mail order. This made orders somewhat more convenient to collectors who did not have Internet or a computer/laptop. More Clubby orders soon came on demand.
