= Beanie Babies 2.0 =

Brand of stuffed toys

Beanie Babies 2.0 were a brand of stuffed toys, a spin-off of the popular Beanie Babies line, announced by Ty Inc. on January 2, 2008. The group was introduced following the retirement of all retail Beanie Babies (barring exclusive international and store-specific styles, as well as licensed characters) that had been produced prior to 2004.

Each toy came with a special code. Once the buyer entered the code on Ty's website, the buyer was granted access to an online environment, in which the user could gather points and communicate with other users through chat services. The chat is similar to child-friendly games such as Club Penguin, which allow pre-selected prompts to be used if the user has not been given permission (presumably from their parents) to access the full chat, where anything can be typed. The prompts could also be used in addition to full chat. The website offered various activities, including opportunities to make friends. Buyers with a Ty Girlz account and a Beanie Baby 2.0 also had access to the Beanie Babies 2.0 site.

With Bo the Portuguese Water Dog being the last official Beanie Baby 2.0 (announced in April 2009) and the introduction of a new offshoot line of Beanie Babies called Beanie Boos, it was unclear as to whether the company had discontinued production of Beanie Babies 2.0 or whether future releases would be announced. In January 2010, in the new Ty spring catalog, the Beanie Babies 2.0 styles were shown merged with regular Beanie Babies, thus confirming that the line had been discontinued. For some time, the online site still maintained its functionality, and many Beanie Baby 2.0 styles still remain current. However, many styles, such as Ming the panda bear and Topper the giraffe, now sport original Beanie Baby hang tags without codes.

On June 7, 2013, the Beanie Babies 2.0 virtual world was officially closed, along with the Ty Girlz virtual world.
