= Ty Girlz =

Girl dolls retailed from 2007 to 2013

- Type: Girl dolls
- Invented by: Ty Warner
- Company: Ty Inc.
- Availability: 2007–2013

Ty Girlz were dolls manufactured by Ty Inc. Similar to the Ty Beanie Babies, the Ty Girlz were on a limited release pattern, with dolls being introduced and older ones retired at various times. They were plush toys that connected to an online virtual world at TyGirlz.com. Introduced to the global market on April 13, 2007, Ty Girlz was one of only a few virtual worlds geared to girls. The line was discontinued in 2013 and the virtual world shut down on June 7 of that same year.

== Advertising ==
When the Ty Girlz were debuted at toy fairs, Ty had posters and cut-outs of the Girlz to promote them. Ty even had a billboard in Atlanta, Georgia, showing Sizzlin' Sue saying "Who's that Girl?". That phrase soon became a popular tag for the line. In September 2007, the Ty Girlz got a MySpace and YouTube page.

In the Spring 2008 Ty retailer catalog, retailers were able to purchase clothing made exclusively for Ty Girlz.

== Sweet Sasha and Marvelous Malia controversy ==
In January 2009, Ty released two new Ty Girlz, one named Sweet Sasha and the other named Marvelous Malia. Media reports linked the names to Sasha and Malia Obama, daughters of President Barack Obama. On January 21, a Ty spokesperson told the Chicago Sun-Times that the Obama daughters were indeed the inspiration for the dolls. In response to Ty, Michelle Obama's press secretary said that Ty did not ask permission to use the Obama daughters' first names, saying "It is inappropriate to use young private citizens for marketing purposes." On January 22, when asked whether the new Ty Girlz were inspired by Sasha and Malia Obama, Ty's Senior Vice President of Sales said that the dolls were not made to physically resemble either of the Obama daughters and that the names chosen "worked very well with the dolls". Ty said that the process of naming dolls is proprietary information and would not say how the names were given to the dolls. In February 2009, Ty decided to retire the original dolls and give them new names, Marvelous Mariah and Sweet Sydney. The CEO of Ty said the name change was due to Michelle Obama's disapproval of the original names. Ty stated that, while the original names were inspired by "this historic time in our nation's history", they were not named after the Obama daughters. Ty promised to donate the profits from sales of the original dolls to a charity, the Andre Agassi Charitable Foundation for youth education.

Following the recall, dolls that had already been shipped to the marketplace sold on eBay for $3,000.

== List of dolls ==
Name	Hair Color	Eye Color	Special Clothing	Release date	Retired?
Lovely Lola	Blonde	Light Blue	Pink fur coat, crop top with heart, white pleated skirt, pink leggings and sandals, gold hoop earrings	April 2007	Yes
Sassy Star	Blue	Green	White trimmed blue fur coat and crop top with star, blue jeans, blue boots, pink or blue lipstick, silver hoop earrings (she along with Ruby are the only two Ty Girlz without a wire "skeleton" and a comb)	April 2007	Yes
Dazzlin' Destiny	Red	Green	Brown suede jacket, crop top, and cowboy boots, jeans, gold bracelet, ruby necklace (she is the first Ty Girl without earrings) (she is named after a Disney Channel star)	April 2007	Yes
Rockin' Ruby	Black (occasionally dirty blonde)	Light Brown	Black latex jacket and pants with a pink cat on the pants leg, black crop top, and sandals, pearl earrings (she along with Star are the only two Ty Girlz without a wire "skeleton" and a comb)	April 2007	Yes
Sizzlin' Sue	Pink (occasionally rainbow)	Light Brown	Pink suede jacket, tank top, boots, and pink leopard skirt, pearl earrings, silver necklace	April 2007	Yes
Punky Penny	Purple	Light Blue	Purple jacket, tank top, and skirt, pink snakeskin boots, amethyst hoop earrings, gold bracelet	April 2007	Yes
Cute Candy	Rainbow	Light Blue	Denim jacket, gray striped tank top, and pink plaid skirt, blue and pink sandals, silver hoop earrings, and bracelet	July 2007	Yes
Pretty Patti	Pink with pink streaks	Light Blue	Pink jacket, tank top and pink skirt, pink and white sandals, pink earrings, and bracelet	July 2007	Yes
Jammin' Jenna	Brown with blonde streaks	Dark Brown	Red and white striped shirt and jeans, red sandals, gold hoop earrings, and bracelet (she is the first Ty Girl without a jacket, and one of the only ones not to wear a belt holding up her pants)	July 2007	Yes
Classy Carla	Golden blonde	Green	Sparkle fur coat, black lace top and gold holographic pants, sandals, earrings, and bracelet	July 2007	Yes
Bubbly Britney	Blonde	Dark Brown	Pink tank top and bolero and denim jeans, pink sneakers, and earrings based on Britney Spears. (she is the first Ty Girl not to wear a belt and the first to wear visible socks)	October 2007	Yes
Totally Trish	Purple	Dark Blue	White tee with bedazzled hearts, miniskirt and purple leather jacket, purple sandals, and bracelet, silver earrings	October 2007	Yes
Supercool Serena	Black with fuchsia streaks	Dark Brown	Pink crop top, silver and black leopard print jacket with pink interior, denim skirt with pink outlines, silver sandals, black earrings, and necklace. Serena is the only Asian Ty Girl.	October 2007	Yes
Lucky Lindsay	Brown with golden blonde streaks	Light Brown	Fleece navy capris with pink stripes, pink hoodie with navy stripes, navy tank top, white sneakers, pink earrings (she is named after an actress)	October 2007	Yes
Precious Paris	Dirty blonde	Light Blue	Pink leather jacket with a white tank top and denim skirt, white boots, silver earrings and necklace (she is the last Ty Girl to wear a belt over her skirt/pants) (she is named after a model)	January 2008	Yes
Cutie Cathy	Brown	Green	Black flower jacket over a white shirt, distressed jeans, red shoes, bronze earrings	January 2008	Yes
Happy Hillary	Blonde	Dark Brown	Grey sweatshirt with a pink sport shirt and plaid sweatpants, pink shoes, pearl earrings (she is named after a Disney Channel star)	January 2008	Yes
Sweet Sammi	Strawberry blonde	Light Blue	Red-orange sweatshirt with a white shirt and brown capris, beige sneakers, pearl earrings	January 2008	Yes
Awesome Ashley	Sandy blonde	Dark Brown	Pink polka dot shirt, denim skirt, black leggings, pink sneakers, sapphire bracelet, pink beret(occasionally, she is the first Ty Girl to sometimes wear a hat) (she is the second Ty Girl without earrings) (she is named after a Disney Channel star)	July 2008	Yes
Trendy Taylor	Brown with pink streaks	Green	Green hoodie, white tank top, hot pink sweatpants, and flip flops, pink and green-striped beanie (occasionally) (she is the last Ty Girl to wear a jacket, and the third without earrings)	July 2008	Yes
Preppy Paige	Brown	Light Blue	Purple shirt with dog print, plaid skirt, white socks, black sneakers, amethyst earrings, purple beret (occasionally)	July 2008	Yes
Lovable Lily	Pink with blue streaks	Light Blue	Silver striped hoodie, pink T-shirt, distressed blue jeans, gray sneakers, pink earrings, pink baseball cap (occasionally)	July 2008	Yes
Hip Hannah	Blonde with black and pink streaks	Dark Brown	Black skull-print shirt, pink plaid skirt, knee-high socks, pink sneakers, pink earrings, black baseball cap (occasionally)	October 2008	Yes
Marvelous Madison	Brown with blonde steaks	Dark Blue	Blue thermal shirt, navy blue jeans, floral print fur boots, pink earrings	October 2008	Yes
Exciting Emily	Reddish-brown	Green	Lavender varsity tee, aqua sweatpants, grey gym shoes, lavender, and aqua beanie (occasionally)	October 2008	Yes
Oo-LaLa Olivia	Blonde with pink streaks	Light Brown	Pink Eiffel Tower tee, grey denim skirt, pink Ugg boots, pink earrings, pink beret (occasionally)	October 2008	Yes
Beautiful Brianna	Brown	Light Blue	Blue and green argyle print shirt, blue twill skirt, blue and green flats, sapphire earrings, green baseball cap (occasionally)	January 2009	Yes
Lovely Lauren	Brown with pink streaks	Dark Brown	Pink and white striped shirt, skinny jeans, floral print shoes, pink earrings, gray beret (occasionally)	January 2009	Yes
Amazing Abby	Chocolate brown with chestnut steaks	Dark Brown	Heather grey hoodie, pink plaid shorts, pink socks, chestnut Uggs, pink earrings (she is the only Ty Girl to wear shorts) (she is the only Latina)	January 2009	Yes
Kool Kayla	Blonde	Dark Blue	Navy athletic tee, striped ruffle skirt, high sport socks, navy sneakers, pink earrings, navy baseball cap (rare)	January 2009	Yes
Marvelous Mariah (formerly Malia)	Black	Dark Brown	Aqua shirt with butterflies, capri jeans with plaid cuffs, aqua sneakers, turquoise earrings, pink baseball cap (occasionally) (she and Sydney are the only black Ty Girlz)	January 2009	Yes
Sweet Sydney (formerly Sasha)	Black	Dark Brown	White and pink babydoll dress, aqua leggings, plaid sneakers, pink earrings, aqua beret (occasionally) (she and Mariah are the only black Ty Girlz)	January 2009	Yes
Totally Troy	Brown	Dark Brown	Forest green varsity shirt, dark blue jeans, black sneakers, blue striped beanie (occasionally) (he is named after a Disney Channel star) (he is the only "Ty Guy")	February 2009	Yes
Joyful Justice	Brown	Light Blue	Peace shirt, black leggings, purple scarf, purple and white sneakers, ruby earrings	June 2009	Yes
Joyful Justice	Brown	Light Blue	4th of July outfit	September 2010	Yes

Ty Girlz Clothing Accessories	Description	Release date	Retirement Date
Cool Preppy	Khaki pants with a pink plaid belt, white collar shirt with a black vest, and a pink plaid bag	February 2008	May 30, 2008
Fairy Princess	purple dress with purple wings, sequined headband	February 2008	May 30, 2008
Girlz Night Out	Pink ruffled dress with a white boa and silver clutch bag	February 2008	May 30, 2008
Super Sporty	white ski pants, blue and white striped shirt, and white ski vest	February 2008	May 30, 2008
Uptown Girl	denim skirt, green jacket, pink hat	February 2008	May 30, 2008
Beach Bash	Hawaiian dress, green hoodie, hot pink tote bag	July 2008	February 7, 2013
School Cool	graphic tee, velour bag, denim skirt	July 2008	December 12, 2012
Hangin' Out	velour tracksuit, star-printed duffle bag	July 2008	December 18, 2012
Best Dressed	red ruffle dress, black and white polka dot cardigan, black bag	December 2008	December 18, 2012
Sweet Dreams	Ice cream and candy themed pajamas, screen printed pillow	December 2008	December 12, 2012
Cool-n-Cozy	white hoodie, aqua corduroy pleated skirt, striped scarf	December 2008	December 18, 2012
Peace, Love & Cozy (Justice Store exclusive)	Peace sign-themed loungewear and cozy	June 2009	2013 cancellation
Polo Prepster (Justice Store exclusive)	Green-and-black-striped layered polo shirt, denim skirt, and black messenger bag	June 2009	2013 cancellation
School Rock (Justice Store exclusive)	3-in-1 matching pink plaid shirt and tie, pleated skirt, and backpack	June 2009	2013 cancellation

Ty Girlz Animals	Description	Retired?
Fabulous Fluffy	Fluffy white dog with pink houndstooth carrier, removable collar, and leash	Yes
Little Lucky	Brown dog with a blue plaid carrier, removable collar, and leash	Yes
Peppermint Princess	Pink-and-white cat with teal floral-print pattern carrier, removable collar, and leash	Yes
Dalmatian	Sold with some releases of Awesome Ashley	Yes
Cocker Spaniel	Sold with some releases of Beautiful Brianna	Yes
Husky	Sold with some releases of Exciting Emily	Yes
Black Cat	Sold with some releases of Hip Hannah	Yes
Chihuahua	Sold with some releases of Lovable Lily	Yes
Gray-and-White Cat	Sold with some releases of Lovely Lauren	Yes
Bo	Sold with some releases of Sweet Sydney and/or Marvelous Mariah	Yes
Poodle	Sold with some releases of Oo-la-la Olivia	Yes
Sheepdog	Sold with some releases of Preppy Paige	Yes
Labrador Retriever	Sold with some releases of Trendy Taylor	Yes
Bulldog	Sold with some releases of Totally Troy	Yes
