= Snuggy (disambiguation) =

Snuggy may refer to:

- Wedgie
- The SNUGGIE® brand sleeved blanket made by Allstar Marketing Group, Inc.
- Snuggy (Pillow Pal), Pillow Pal bear made by Ty, Inc.
- Baby sling
