= The Beanie Bubble =

2023 film by Kristin Gore and Damian Kulash Jr

- Release poster
- Directed by: Kristin Gore; Damian Kulash Jr.
- Screenplay by: Kristin Gore
- Based on: The Great Beanie Baby Bubble: Mass Delusion and the Dark Side of Cute by Zac Bissonnette
- Produced by: Brian Grazer; Ron Howard; Karen Lunder
- Starring: Zach Galifianakis; Elizabeth Banks; Sarah Snook; Geraldine Viswanathan
- Cinematography: Steven Meizler
- Edited by: Jane Rizzo
- Music by: Nathan Barr; Damian Kulash Jr.
- Production companies: Apple Studios; Imagine Entertainment
- Distributed by: Apple TV+
- Release dates: July 21, 2023 (United States); July 28, 2023 (Apple TV+)
- Running time: 110 minutes
- Country: United States
- Language: English

The Beanie Bubble is a 2023 American comedy-drama film directed by Kristin Gore and Damian Kulash Jr. from a screenplay by Gore, based on the 2015 book The Great Beanie Baby Bubble: Mass Delusion and the Dark Side of Cute by Zac Bissonnette about the Beanie Babies bubble. The film stars Zach Galifianakis, Elizabeth Banks, Sarah Snook, and Geraldine Viswanathan.

The Beanie Bubble was released in select theaters on July 21, 2023, before its streaming release on July 28, 2023, by Apple TV+.

== Plot ==
The film tells the story behind the 1990s Beanie Babies craze. It follows toy manufacturer Ty Warner and the women who were integral to his success. Robbie, Sheila, and Maya help turn Beanie Babies into the coveted products they became. The characters are based on three real women: Patricia Roche, Faith McGowan, and Lina Trivedi, who each played integral roles in increasing Beanie Babies’ popularity.

== Cast ==
- Zach Galifianakis as Ty Warner
- Elizabeth Banks as Robbie
- Sarah Snook as Sheila
- Geraldine Viswanathan as Maya
- Tracey Bonner as Rose
- Carl Clemons-Hopkins as Jeremy
- Delaney Quinn as Marin
- Hari Dhillon as Arjun Kumar
- Ajay Friese as Deshad
- Sweta Keswani as Neeti Kumar
- Kurt Yaeger as Billy

== Production ==
It was announced in January 2022 that Apple TV+ had acquired the distribution rights for the film, which would see Zach Galifianakis, Elizabeth Banks, Sarah Snook, and Geraldine Viswanathan star, with Kristin Gore and Damian Kulash directing.

Filming began in April 2022 in Marietta, Georgia. Production also took place in Atlanta.

The film features a new original track from Kulash’s band OK Go, titled "This".

== Reception ==
On the review aggregator website Rotten Tomatoes, 46% of 99 critics' reviews are positive, with an average rating of 5.6/10. The website's consensus reads: "The Beanie Bubble's cast makes the movie an easy watch, but that enjoyment is lessened by its shallow treatment of the real-life story." Metacritic, which uses a weighted average, assigned the film a score of 49 out of 100, based on 25 critics, indicating "mixed or average" reviews.

The New York Times critic Calum Marsh unfavorably compared The Beanie Bubble to other "corporate biopics" released in 2023, including Air and Tetris, and said that it "deploys every storytelling cliché in the book". Peter Bradshaw of The Guardian criticised the film's "deeply muddled non-storytelling and tonal blandness", and the Evening Standard's Charlotte O'Sullivan said its "clichéd" script offers "a lazy take on power and greed". Digital Spy's Mireia Mullor called the film "understuffed" but said Geraldine Viswanathan's performance "steals the show".

== See also ==
- Dark Side of the 90s - featuring an episode about the infamous "Beanie bubble"
