= Roary =

Roary may refer to:

== Mascots ==
- Roary the Florida Panther, mascot of the FIU Panthers college sports teams
- Roary the Lion, mascot of American football team Detroit Lions
- Roary the Lion, mascot of English football club Middlesbrough F.C.

== Other uses ==
- Roary the Racing Car, a 2007–2010 British animated children's television show
- Roary the lion, a retired Beanie Baby
- Roary, or Roar E. Saurus, a puppet character from Blue's Room
