= Retirement (disambiguation) =

Retirement is the end of a person's career, usually due to old age.

Retirement may also refer to:

== Arts, entertainment, and media ==
- Retirement (Beanie Baby), the end of production of a Ty Beanie Baby
- Retirement Living TV, now called RLTV, an American cable television network which transitioned its programming to an OTT channel in August 2018

== Military ==
- Withdrawal (military)

== Sports ==
- Out (baseball)
- Retirement (cricket)
- Retired number, a uniform number whose use a sports team has discontinued in honor of an outstanding member who held it
