= Karenna Gore =

American author and lawyer (born 1973)

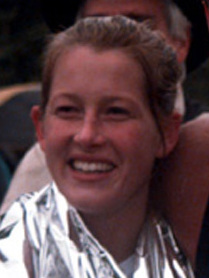
- Gore in 1997
- Born: Karenna Aitcheson Gore; August 6, 1973 (age 53); Nashville, Tennessee, U.S.
- Education: Harvard University (BA); Columbia University (JD); Union Theological Seminary (MA)
- Spouse: Andrew Schiff (m. 1997; div. 2010)
- Children: 3
- Parents: Al Gore (father); Tipper Gore (mother)
- Relatives: Kristin Gore (sister)
- Writing career
- Notable work: Lighting the Way: Nine Women Who Shaped Modern America

Karenna Aitcheson Gore (born August 6, 1973) is an American author, lawyer, and climate activist. She is the eldest daughter of former U.S. vice president Al Gore and Tipper Gore and is the founder and executive director of the Center for Earth Ethics at Union Theological Seminary.

== Early life ==
Gore was born on August 6, 1973, to Al and Tipper Gore in Nashville, Tennessee, and grew up there as well as in Washington, D.C. She has three younger siblings, Kristin, Sarah, and Albert III.

When Karenna was 11 years old, her mother Tipper overheard her listening to Prince's song "Darling Nikki", which contained explicit lyrics that inspired her mother to launch the Parents Music Resource Center, which sought to have "parental warning labels affixed to record albums that contained sexually explicit lyrics, portrayed excessive violence, or glorified drugs."

Gore earned her B.A. (magna cum laude) in history and literature in 1995 from Harvard University, a J.D. from Columbia Law School in 2000, and an M.A. in social ethics from Union Theological Seminary in 2013. During college, she interned as a journalist for WREG-TV and The Times-Picayune. She later wrote for El País in Spain and Slate in Seattle.

=== 2000 presidential campaign and book ===
Gore was the Youth Outreach Chair on her father's 2000 presidential campaign. Together with her father's former Harvard roommate Tommy Lee Jones, she officially nominated her father as the presidential candidate during the 2000 Democratic Convention in Los Angeles. She also introduced her father during the launching of his campaign.

In 2006, she published Lighting the Way: Nine Women Who Shaped Modern America, a profile of nine modern and historical American women. Stating that the book was written in reaction to the results of the 2000 campaign, Gore said, "I wanted to turn all that frustration and sadness into something positive."

== Professional career ==
After law school, Gore worked briefly as an associate with the law firm Simpson Thacher & Bartlett in New York City. She left that job to work in the non-profit sector as director of community affairs for the Association to Benefit Children (ABC), and as a volunteer in the legal center of Sanctuary for Families.

After graduating from Union Theological Seminary in 2013, Gore was asked to lead the Union Forum, a platform for theological scholarship to engage with civic discourse and social change. In 2014, she organized "Religions for the Earth," a conference held in conjunction with the 2014 United Nations Climate Summit. Religions for the Earth brought together more than 200 religious and spiritual leaders to redefine the climate crisis "as an urgent moral imperative."

Based on the success of this conference, Gore founded the Center for Earth Ethics (CEE) at Union Theological Seminary the following year. CEE "bridges the worlds of religion, academia, politics, and culture to discern and pursue the necessary changes to stop ecological destruction and create a society that values life." She is CEE's executive director and is an ex officio faculty member of The Earth Institute at Columbia University.

She serves on the boards of the Association to Benefit Children, Pando Populus, and Riverkeeper. She is also an expert in the United Nations’ Harmony with Nature Knowledge Network.

=== Activism ===
Gore has been heavily involved in climate activism, both in writing and direct action, including opposition to the construction of new pipelines and other infrastructure to support the fossil fuel industry.

In 2016, Gore was part of the successful campaign against a fracked gas pipeline (the Constitution pipeline) through New York state, publishing an op-ed in the New York Times on the issue.

In June 2016, Gore was among 23 protesters who were arrested for demonstrating at the site of construction of a pipeline in Boston that would carry fracked gas for the Houston-based Spectra company. She subsequently published an opinion piece, "Why I was arrested in West Roxbury," in The Boston Globe.

In 2021, on the 49th anniversary of the Clean Water Act, she published a guest essay in the Virginia Mercury in opposition to the Mountain Valley Pipeline.

== Personal life ==
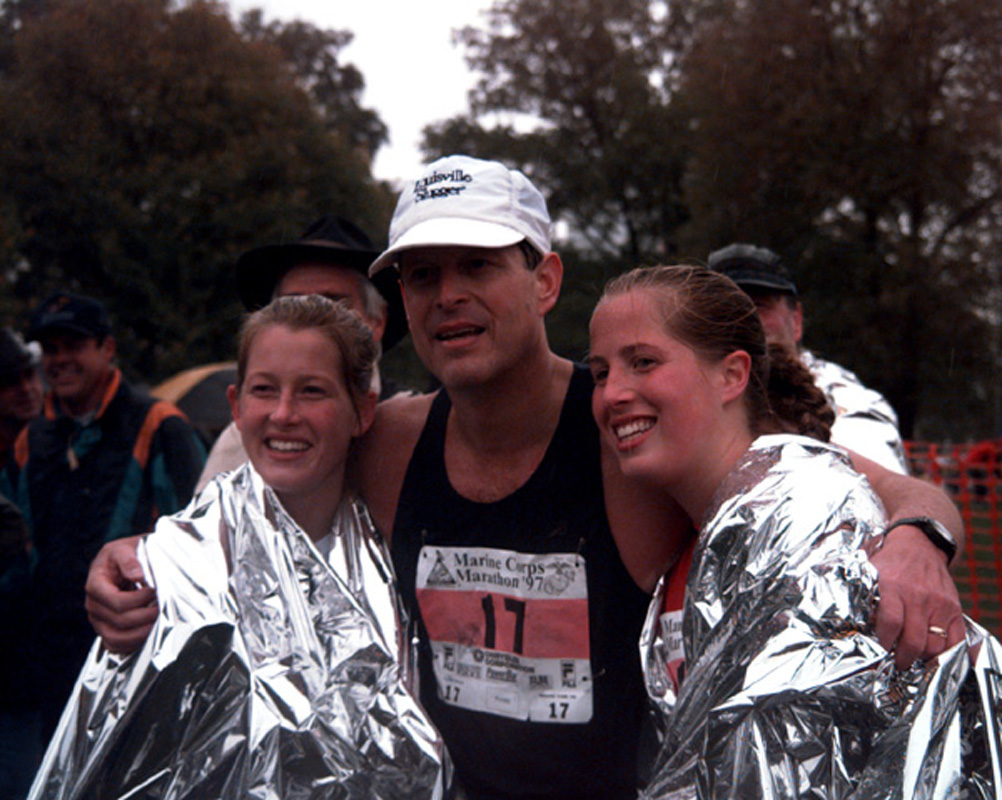
Karenna Gore (left) with father Al and sister Kristen in 1997

On July 12, 1997, she married Andrew Newman Schiff, a Washington, D.C. primary care physician and a great-great-grandson of 19th century banker Jacob Schiff, at the Washington National Cathedral. Andrew Schiff now works as a biotechnology fund manager. They have three children together: Wyatt Gore Schiff (born July 4, 1999 in New York City), Anna Hunger Schiff (born August 23, 2001 in New York City), and Oscar Aitcheson Schiff (born in 2006). Gore and Schiff separated in 2010 and later divorced.
