= Puffkins =

Stuffed toy line

Puffkins is a series of spherical stuffed animals distributed by Lisle, Illinois-based Swibco. It was introduced in 1997 as a competitor to Beanie Babies. Puffkins are sold with a tag containing a birthdate and poem, and like Beanie Babies, the toys have new designs introduced and other designs retired. Although Puffkins were retired in 2002, Swibco re-introduced the line as Puffkins 2 in 2007 with mostly the same design.

== History ==
Swibco, a toy company based in Lisle, Illinois, introduced the Puffkins line on May 24, 1997. Thirteen different Puffkins designs were released on that day. Like Beanie Babies, every Puffkin wore a heart-shaped swing tag bearing a name, poem and birth date, and various designs were retired and introduced periodically. Certain designs of the toys were also considered more valuable, usually because of a low production number or a rarely seen color variation. The most valuable was a white tiger named Snowball; the first Puffkin to be retired, its original design sold for as high as $150. Puffkins are designed in a spherical form without arms, and measure about 6 inches (15 cm) in diameter, with a smaller keyring variation measuring 4 inches (10 cm). Swibco retired the Puffkins line in 2002, but restarted the toy line in 2007 under the name Puffkins 2, which feature largely the same design but are made of a softer material.
