= Tipper Gore =

Second Lady of the United States from 1993 to 2001

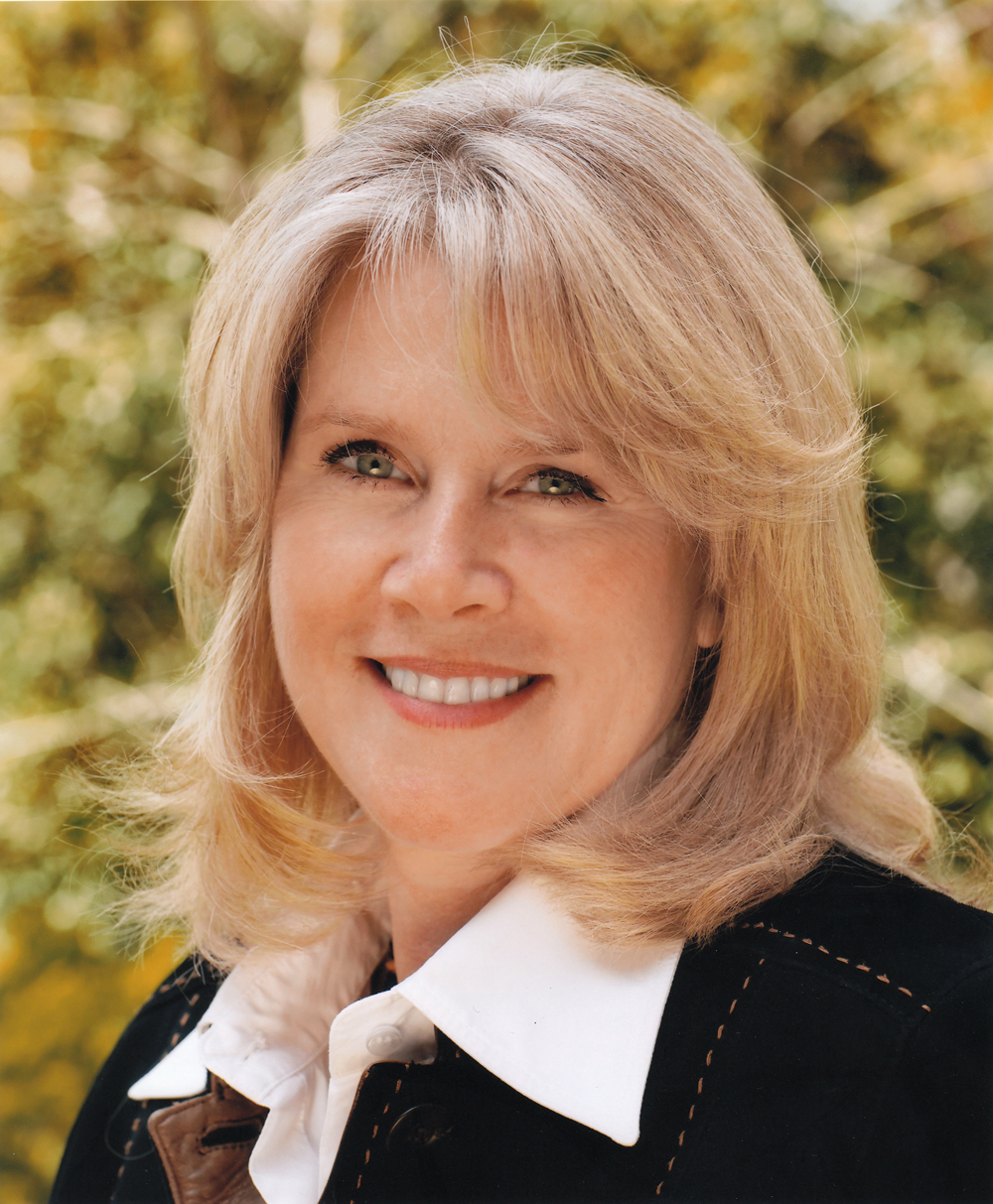
- Gore in 2009

Second Lady of the United States
- In role January 20, 1993 – January 20, 2001
- Vice President: Al Gore
- Preceded by: Marilyn Quayle
- Succeeded by: Lynne Cheney

Personal details
- Born: Mary Elizabeth Aitcheson; August 19, 1948 (age 78) Washington, D.C., U.S.
- Party: Democratic
- Spouse: Al Gore (m. 1970; sep. 2010)
- Children: 4, including Karenna and Kristin
- Education: Garland Junior College; Boston University (BA); Vanderbilt University (MA)

Mary Elizabeth "Tipper" Gore (née Aitcheson; born August 19, 1948) is an American social issues advocate who was the second lady of the United States from 1993 to 2001. She was married to Al Gore, the 45th vice president, from 1970 to 2010.

In 1985, Gore co-founded the Parents Music Resource Center (PMRC), which advocated for the introduction of warning labels on record covers featuring profane language or unacceptable themes. Throughout her decades of public life, she has advocated for mental health awareness, women's causes, children's causes, LGBT rights, and reducing homelessness.

== Early life and education ==
Born Mary Elizabeth Aitcheson in Washington, D.C., Tipper Gore is the daughter of John Kenneth "Jack" Aitcheson Jr., a plumbing-supply entrepreneur and owner of J & H Aitcheson Plumbing Supply, and his first wife, Margaret Ann (née Carlson) Odom (who lost her first husband during World War II). She was given the nickname "Tipper" by her mother, from a lullaby her mother had heard. Gore grew up in Arlington, Virginia. Her mother and grandmother raised her after her parents divorced.

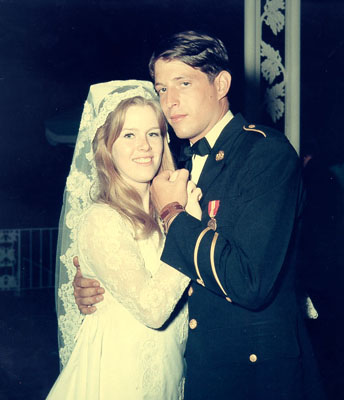
Al and Tipper Gore's wedding day, May 19, 1970, at the Washington National Cathedral

She attended St. Agnes (now St. Stephen's & St. Agnes School), a private Episcopal school in Alexandria, Virginia, where she played basketball, softball and field hockey, and played the drums for an all-female band called The Wildcats.

She met Al Gore at his senior prom in 1965. Although she came to the prom with one of his classmates, Gore and Tipper began to date immediately afterwards. When Al Gore began attending Harvard University, she enrolled in Garland Junior College (now part of Simmons College) and later transferred to Boston University, receiving her B.A. in psychology in 1970. On May 19, 1970, she and Gore were married at the Washington National Cathedral.

Gore pursued a master's degree in psychology from Vanderbilt University's George Peabody College, graduating in 1975.

== Career ==
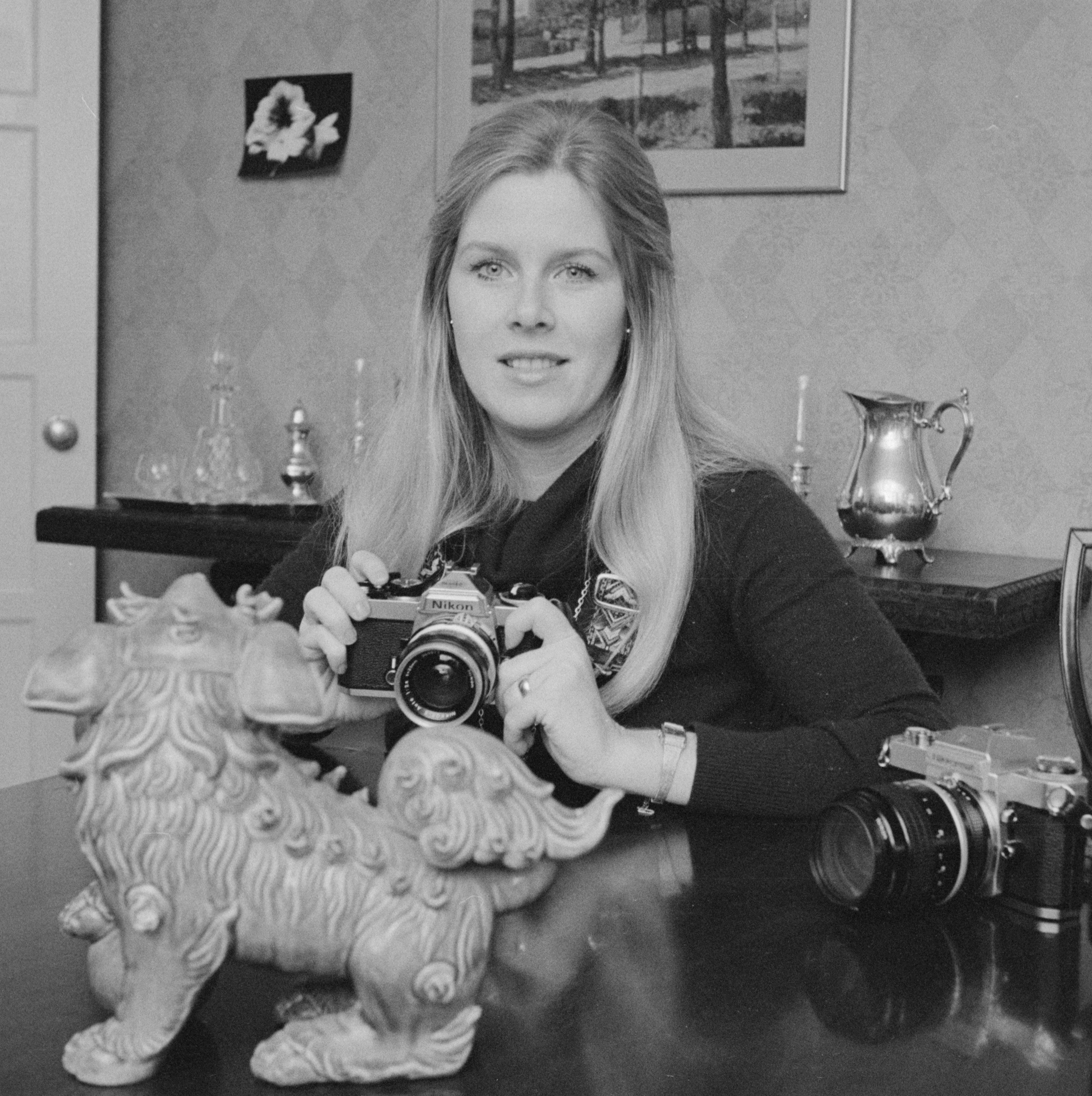
Tipper Gore holding a Nikon FE in 1979

Gore worked part-time as a newspaper photographer for Nashville's The Tennessean and continued as a freelance photographer in Washington after her husband was elected to the U.S. Congress in 1976.

== Politics and activism ==
Gore took an active role in her husband's political pursuits starting with his first campaign for the United States House of Representatives from Tennessee in 1976. Soon after her husband's election, Gore established a group to examine and write about social issues called the Congressional Wives Task Force.

In 1984, Gore began volunteering in homeless shelters. Homelessness became a major cause for Gore, and she formed a group called Families for the Homeless to raise funds and awareness for the issue.

=== Parents Music Resource Center ===
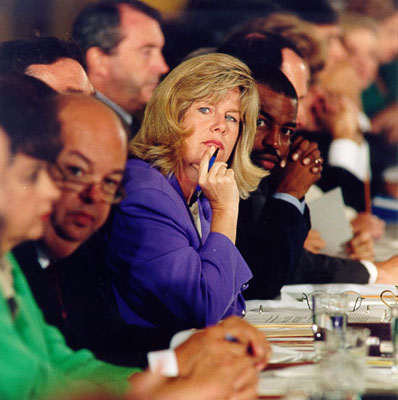
Gore with the PMRC in 1985

In 1985, Tipper Gore co-founded the Parents Music Resource Center (PMRC) with Sally Nevius, Pam Howar, and Susan Baker, wife of then–United States secretary of the treasury James Baker, because Gore heard her then 11-year-old daughter Karenna playing "Darling Nikki" by Prince. The group's goal was to increase parental and consumer awareness of music that contained explicit content through voluntary labeling of albums with Parental Advisory stickers. Their coalition included the National PTA and the American Academy of Pediatrics. The PMRC had no members, merely founders, and all of the founders were wives of prominent politicians.

According to an article by NPR, Gore went "before Congress to urge warning labels for records marketed to children." Gore explained that her purpose wasn't to put a "gag" on music, but to keep it safe for younger listeners by providing parents with information about the content of the songs. A number of individuals including Glenn Danzig of Danzig/Misfits, Dee Snider of Twisted Sister, Jello Biafra of the Dead Kennedys, John Denver, Joey Ramone, and Frank Zappa criticized the group, arguing that it was a form of censorship. Gore's relationship with Snider was particularly antagonistic, with Snider accusing her of having a "dirty mind" for suggesting that his band's song "Under the Blade" contained sadomasochistic references, when the song in fact referred to medical surgery instead. In response to such criticism, NPR further stated that according to Gore, she "wasn't out to censor the objectionable material" and quoted her as stating that she is "a strong believer in the First Amendment" who is calling for greater "consumer information in the marketplace."

The PMRC's efforts resulted in an agreement where recording labels voluntarily placed warning labels on music with violent or sexually explicit lyrics.

=== 1990s to present ===
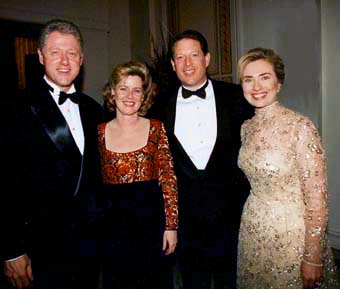
From left to right: Bill Clinton, Tipper Gore, Al Gore, Hillary Clinton

In 1990, Gore founded the Tennessee Voices for Children to advance youth services for mental health and substance abuse. Gore also co-chaired the National Mental Health Association's Child Mental Health Interest Group.

Gore campaigned during her husband's 1988 presidential bid and toured with him and Bill and Hillary Clinton during the presidential campaign of 1992. As spouse of the vice presidential nominee, Gore spoke at the 1996 Democratic National Convention. She spoke again at the 2000 Democratic National Convention, as spouse of the presidential nominee.

As second lady, Gore served as the mental health policy advisor to the president. Her goals were to diminish the stigma surrounding mental illness and to bring awareness to the need for affordable mental health care. In 1999, Gore hosted the first White House Conference on Mental Health. That same year, she launched the National Mental Health Awareness Campaign (NMHAC) to encourage Americans to seek treatment for mental illness. Gore has frequently spoken about her own experience with depression and treatment following the near-fatal injury of her son Albert.

Along with her work in mental health, Gore was a part of several other initiatives during her time as second lady. She served as special advisor to the Interagency Council on the Homeless and as the national spokesperson for the "Back to Sleep" SIDS awareness campaign. In 1994, Gore visited a refugee camp and an orphanage in Zaire on a personal trip to provide aid in the aftermath of the Rwandan genocide. She stayed in a UNICEF camp and assisted doctors and aid workers. She made an official visit to Honduras in 1998 following Hurricane Mitch to volunteer, bring medical supplies, and survey the damage.

Gore took part in campaigning for the reelection of President Clinton and Vice President Gore in 1996, and she was actively involved in her husband's presidential campaign in 2000, making her own campaign stops and media appearances. She also acted as an advisor and was a part of decisions including the hiring of Tony Coelho as chairman of the campaign and moving its headquarters to Nashville.

In 2002, Gore was urged by her supporters to run for the vacant U.S. Senate seat her husband once held in Tennessee, which was being vacated by Fred Thompson; however, she declined.

As of 2012, she served as co-chair of the advisory board of the Diana Basehart Foundation which assists homeless and low-income people with animal care.

== Advocacy for the LGBT community and AIDS ==
Gore has been a long-time advocate for the LGBT community. She represented the Clinton administration in the Washington, D.C. AIDS Walk in 1993 as one of the highest-ranking public officials ever to participate. She has continued to participate in such walks and, in 2013 she was an honorary chair of the Nashville AIDS Walk & 5K Run. She was a public opponent of California's Proposition 8 to ban same-sex marriage in 2008. In 2014, she created an exhibition of her photographs at the Wall Space Gallery to support the Pacific Pride Foundation that provides services to the HIV/AIDS and LGBTQ communities of Santa Barbara, California.

== Creative roles ==
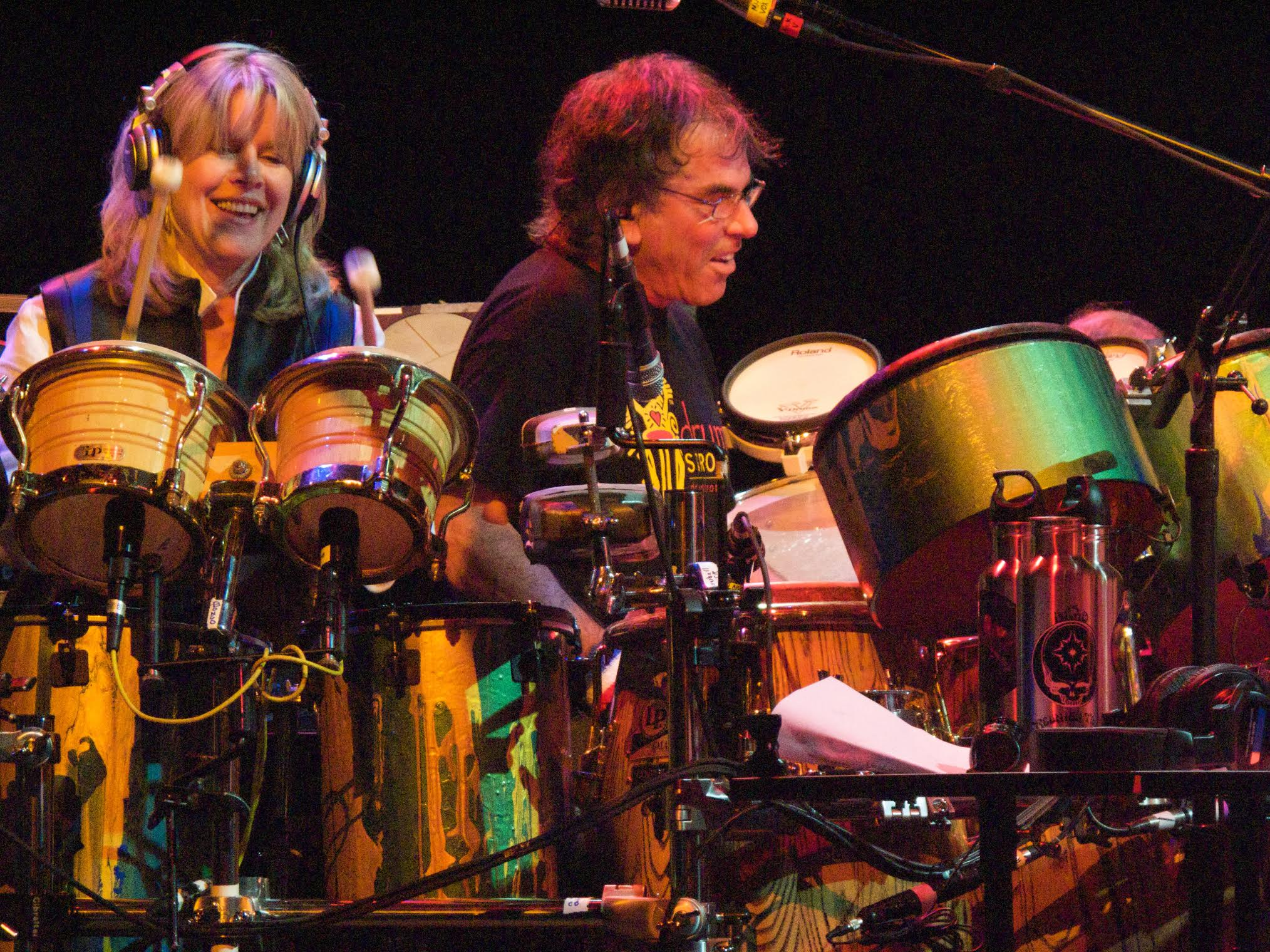
Tipper Gore drumming with Mickey Hart during a The Dead appearance in April 2009

In high school, Gore was the drummer for an all-female band called the Wildcats. She has played drums with members of the Grateful Dead; during the second night of the Spring 2009 Dead tour, Tipper Gore sat in playing drums during the closing song "Sugar Magnolia". In 2000, she appeared on stage at the Equality Rocks concert at Robert F. Kennedy Memorial Stadium to play to a crowd of 45,000 prior to the Millennium March on Washington. Later that year, she played with Willie Nelson during his set at Farm Aid. She played with Herbie Hancock at the 25th Thelonious Monk International Jazz Competition in 2012.

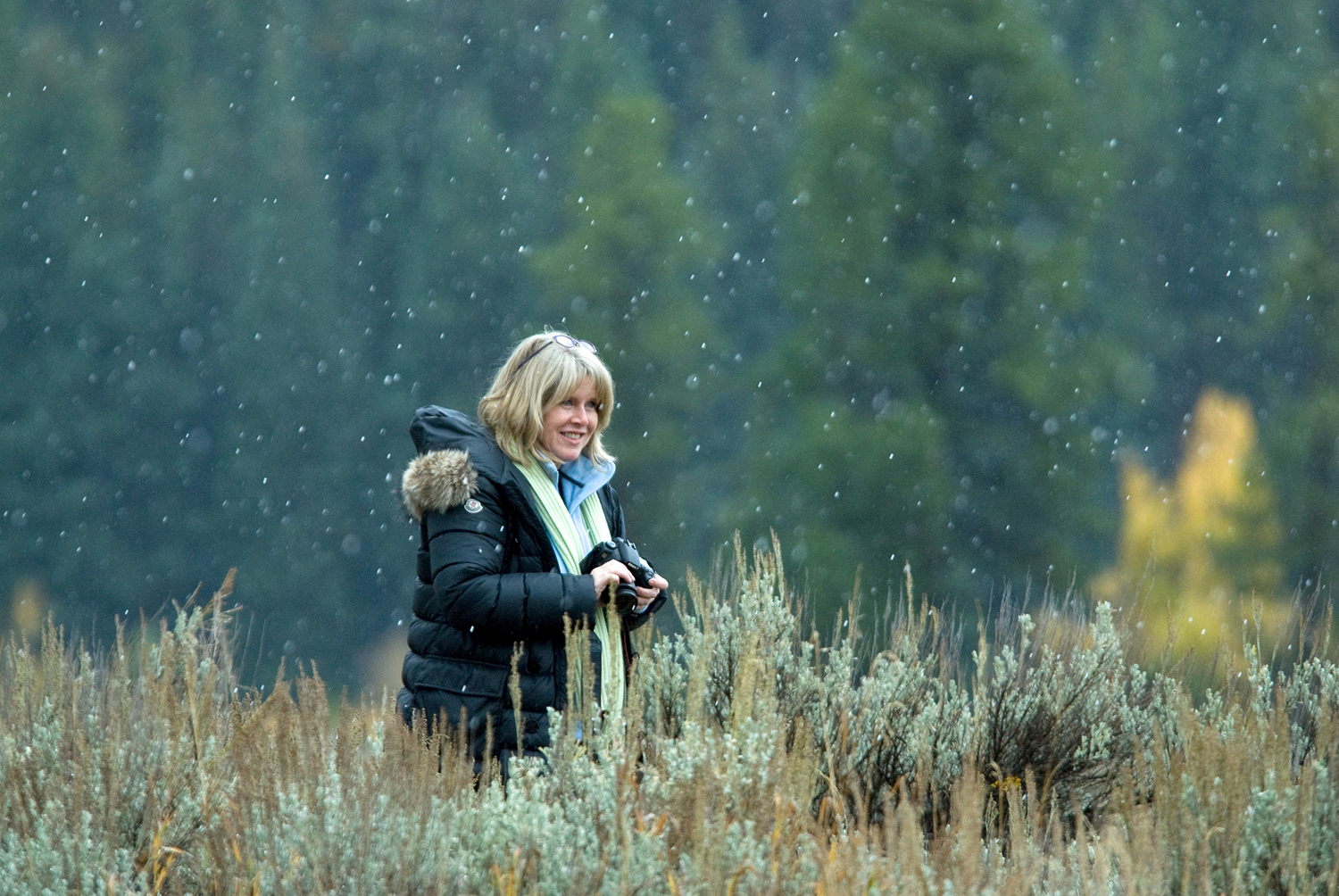
Gore with a camera in 2007

A photographer since the 1970s, Gore has published several books of photography, her photos have been included in exhibits, and her prints have been sold by Mitchell Gold Co. stores.

== Personal life ==
Gore has four children: Karenna Aitcheson Gore (born August 6, 1973), Kristin Carlson Gore Kulash (born June 5, 1977), Sarah LaFon Gore Maiani (born January 7, 1979), and Albert Arnold Gore III (born October 19, 1982); and several grandchildren.

Tipper and Al Gore were baptized at Mount Vernon Baptist Church in Arlington, Virginia, in 1980. Tipper Gore served as a deaconess at Mount Vernon.

In June 2010, the Gores announced their marital separation, "a mutual and mutually supportive decision that we have made together following a process of long and careful consideration." In August 2012, The New York Times reported that both Gores were dating other people and have no plans to resume marriage, but that their "bond endures" and their relationship is friendly. "The couple reunites a few times a year, most recently in June, for summer family vacations and Christmases in the Gore family seat of Carthage, Tennessee," the newspaper reported. As of August 2012 she was dating Bill Allen, who is a former editor of National Geographic.

== Bibliography ==
Tipper Gore is the author of a number of books, including:

- Raising PG Kids in an X-Rated Society, 1987, ISBN 0-687-35282-7
- Picture This: A Visual Diary, 1996, ISBN 0-553-06720-6
- Joined at the Heart: The Transformation of the American Family, 2002, ISBN 0-8050-7450-3, (with Al Gore)
- The Spirit of Family, 2002, ISBN 5-550-15167-7 (with Al Gore)

She has also contributed to the following books:

- The Way Home: Ending Homelessness in America, 2000, ISBN 0-886-7505-8X
- From the Bottom of Our Hearts, 2002, ISBN 1-931718-32-6 (Foreword)

Honorary titles
Preceded by Marilyn Quayle	Second Lady of the United States; 1993–2001	Succeeded by Lynne Cheney
U.S. order of precedence (ceremonial)
Preceded by Al Gore as Former Vice President	Order of precedence of the United States as Former Second Lady	Succeeded by Dick Cheney as Former Vice President
