= Mary Beth's Bean Bag World =

American magazine

- November 1998 issue
- First issue: October 1997
- Final issue: August 2001
- Company: H & S Media
- Country: United States
- Based in: Bannockburn, Illinois
- Language: English
- ISSN: 1525-5085

Mary Beth's Bean Bag World, originally Mary Beth's Beanie World, was an American monthly magazine dedicated to Beanie Babies and competing plush toys.

The magazine's founder, Mary Beth Sobolewski, developed the magazine into a top seller, known for featuring articles and a secondary market price list for Beanie Babies and similar products during the height of their popularity. The headquarters was in Bannockburn, Illinois.

The first issue of Mary Beth's Bean Bag World went on sale in October 1997 and had a circulation of 177,000. It was originally planned as a one-time publication, but based on its success, the publisher decided to produce it quarterly. The second issue sold 444,045 copies. By the time it was one of the top sellers at newsstands, the magazine was being released monthly. The magazine's publisher, H & S Media, eventually filed for bankruptcy. The final issue was published in August 2001.
