= Geraldine Viswanathan =

Australian actress (born 1995)

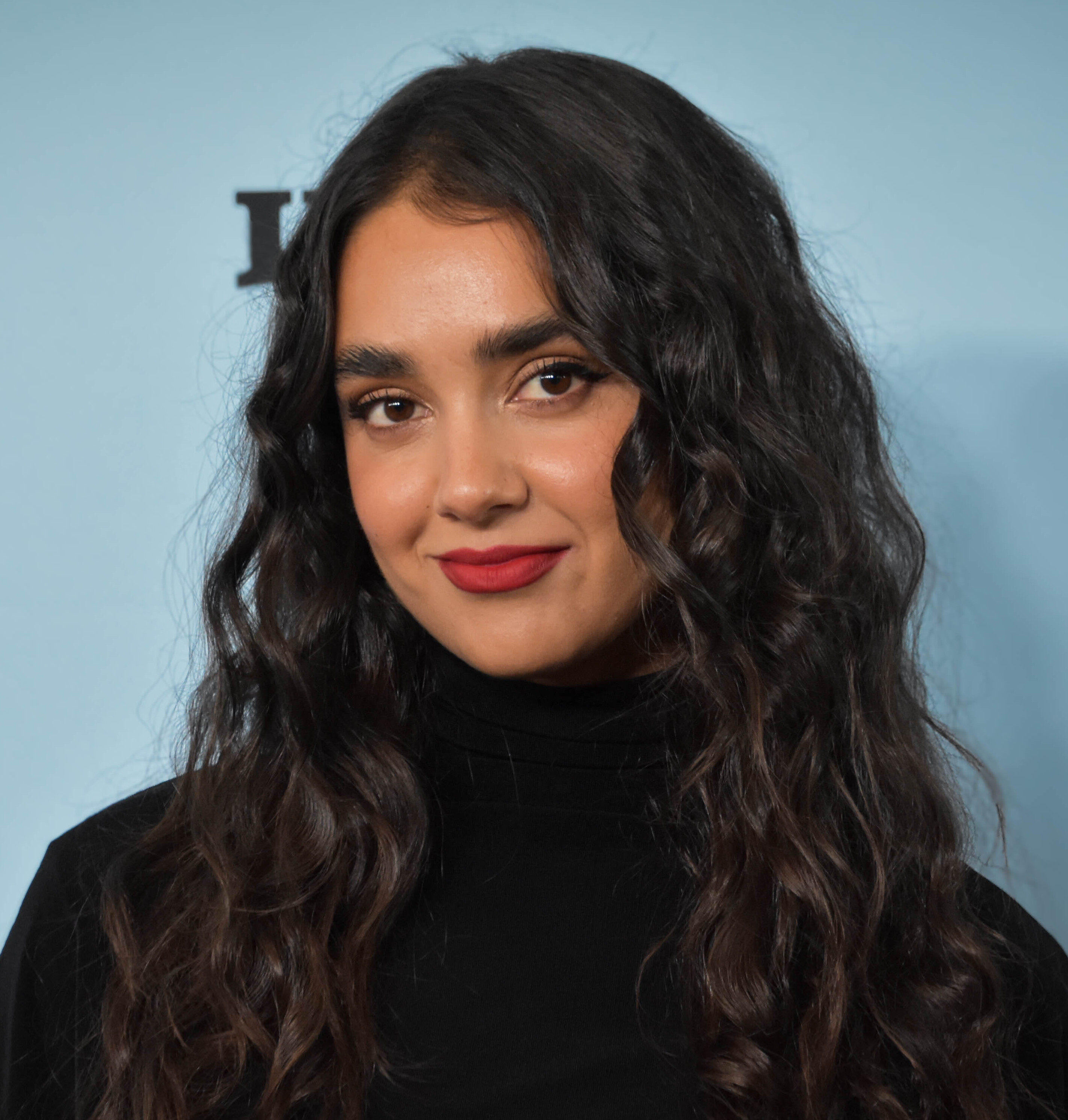
- Viswanathan at the 2025 Sundance Film Festival
- Born: 20 June 1995 (age 31); Newcastle, New South Wales, Australia
- Occupation: Actress
- Years active: 2014–present

Geraldine Viswanathan (/ˌvɪswəˈnɑːθən/ VISS-wə-NAH-thən; born 20 June 1995) is an Australian actress. She gained recognition for her roles in the films Blockers (2018), Hala (2019), Bad Education (2019), and Thunderbolts* (2025). She had a recurring role in the series Janet King (2017) and starred in the TBS comedy anthology Miracle Workers (2019–2023).

== Early life ==
Viswanathan's father, Suresh Viswanathan, is a doctor who works in nuclear medicine and is of Tamil descent from India. Her mother, Anja Raith, is from Switzerland of Swiss-German descent and was raised by a father who was a filmmaker and ballet dancer. Raith attended musical theatre school in London before getting married and settling down in Newcastle. She is an artist.

Viswanathan grew up with a younger sister and a deep love of horses and animals. She attended the Hunter School of the Performing Arts, Newcastle, where she was in drama class.

When she was fifteen, Viswanathan and her family spent some time in Los Angeles, California, where she went through the process of securing a manager with the hopes of obtaining Disney and Nickelodeon roles.

In 2015, Viswanathan was shortlisted for the Heath Ledger Scholarship. While studying International Studies and Journalism, she did stand up and sketch comedy in Sydney.

== Career ==
At the age of four, Viswanathan appeared in a Kodak television commercial. In 2016, she appeared in Emo the Musical and went to Los Angeles for her first pilot season. In 2017, Viswanathan joined the cast of ABC's drama series Janet King in the role of Bonnie. Viswanathan was a reader in casting rooms, and was the reader for the Australian casting process for Crazy Rich Asians.

Her big break came in 2018, when she was cast in the film Blockers. Refinery29 referred to her as "the film's breakout star". In the same year, she was cast in the Netflix film The Package and the drama film Hala which went to Sundance Film Festival. The Hollywood Reporter included her in its "Next Gen Talent" list as one of "20 rising stars among the blockbuster breakouts and small-screen discoveries who are shaking up the industry".

In 2019, Viswanathan was cast in the anthology series Miracle Workers. In 2019, Viswanathan played Rachel in the film Bad Education, which is based on a true story of an embezzlement scandal. She received critical acclaim at the Toronto International Film Festival for the film, which received two Emmy nominations.

Viswanathan next starred in The Broken Hearts Gallery (2020) as a gallery assistant who struggles to give up items from past relationships. About the film, she noted that she feels fortunate to represent brown girls on screen, and appreciated that her mother in the film is blonde and looks a lot like her real mother. The film was due to be released in mid-2020, but postponed until September due to the COVID-19 pandemic.

In 2021, Viswanathan co-starred in and executive produced the romantic comedy 7 Days, a two-hander about a pair of young Indian-Americans who go on an arranged first date just as the COVID-19 pandemic hits. Roshan Sethi's directorial debut, the film won an Independent Spirit Award in 2022 for Best First Feature. In October 2021, she was cast in the psychological thriller film Cat Person, based on the short story by Kristen Roupenian published in 2017 in The New Yorker. Viswanathan also voiced the role of Tawnie in season six of BoJack Horseman.

In January 2022, Viswanathan was cast in the film The Beanie Bubble, co-directed by Kristin Gore and Damian Kulash.

In January 2024, Viswanathan was cast in the Marvel Cinematic Universe film Thunderbolts*, assuming the role 'Mel', previously held by Ayo Edebiri. The film was released on 2 May 2025.

== Filmography ==
Film
Year	Title	Role	Notes
2016	Emo the Musical	Jamali	
2016	All Out Dysfunktion!	Vizzie	
2018	Blockers	Kayla Mannes	
2018	The Package	Becky Abelar	
2019	Hala	Hala Masood	
2019	Bad Education	Rachel Bhargava	
2020	The Broken Hearts Gallery	Lucy Gulliver	
2021	7 Days	Rita	Also executive producer
2021	Rumble	Winnie Coyle (voice)	
2023	Cat Person	Taylor	
2023	The Beanie Bubble	Maya	
2024	Drive-Away Dolls	Marian	
2025	Oh, Hi!	Max	
2025	You're Cordially Invited	Jenni Caldwell	
2025	Thunderbolts*	Mel	
2026	Avatar Aang: The Last Airbender	Kallik (voice)	

=== Television ===
Television
Year	Title	Role	Notes
2015	Lost Angels	Sarah	
2017	The Y2K Bug	Addison	Episode: "High School River"
2017	Janet King	Bonnie Mahesh	Recurring role (series 3), 8 episodes
2018	Nippers of Dead Bird Bay		Episode: "The Riff Raff"
2019–2023	Miracle Workers	Eliza Hunter (season 1); Alexandra "Allie" Shitshoveler (season 2); Prudence Aberdeen (season 3); Freya Exaltada (season 4)	Main cast
2019–2020	BoJack Horseman	Tawnie (voice)	Recurring role (season 6), 3 episodes
2021	Saturday Morning All Star Hits!	Lottie Wolfe	3 episodes
2022	Three Busy Debras	Narrator (voice)	8 episodes
2025	Poker Face	Jenny	Episode: "One Last Job"
2025	Digman!	Parisha (voice)	Episode: “The Eligible Arky”

== Awards and nominations ==
Organizations	Year	Category	Work	Result	Ref.
Hollywood Critics Association	2020	Next Generation of Hollywood	Herself	Honored	
Hollywood Critics Association	2022	Best Actress in a Limited Series or TV Movie	Miracle Workers	Nominated	
