= Dark Side of the 90s =

Documentary television series

- Genre: Documentary
- Directed by: Richard Rotter
- Narrated by: Mark McGrath
- Composer: Orin Isaacs
- Original language: English
- No. of seasons: 3
- No. of episodes: 30

Production
- Executive producers: Matthew Ginsburg; Tim Healy; Mark Lysakowski; John Brunton
- Producers: Vanessa Hill; Matthew Ginsburg; Tim Healy
- Running time: 60 min.
- Production companies: Railsplitter Pictures; Insight Productions

Original release
- Network: Vice on TV
- Release: July 15, 2021 – September 24, 2024

Dark Side of the 90s is a documentary television series created by Insight Productions and RailSplitter Pictures for Vice Studios that takes a look at popular culture of the 1990s. It is a spinoff of Vice's Dark Side of the Ring series. The first episode of Dark Side of the 90s aired on July 15, 2021. The series is narrated by Mark McGrath.

== Series overview ==
Season	Episodes	Originally released	
Season	Episodes	First released	Last released
1	10	July 15, 2021	September 16, 2021
2	10	June 14, 2022	August 9, 2022
3	10	July 16, 2024	September 24, 2024

== Episodes ==
=== Season 1 (2021) ===
No. overall	No. in season	Title	Subject(s)	Original release date	Viewers (millions)
1	1	"Trash TV: Dirty & Deadly Talk"	The explosion of tabloid talk shows (including the critically derided, yet popular, ratings hit, The Jerry Springer Show).	July 15, 2021	N/A
2	2	"The Viper Room: Hollywood's Sanctuary"	Johnny Depp's The Viper Room and the death of River Phoenix.	July 22, 2021	0.150
3	3	"TV for Teens"	The conception of Fox Network and its hit show, Beverly Hills, 90210, and other shows geared at teens (one being Party of Five).	July 29, 2021	0.108
4	4	"Beanie Babies Go Bust"	The rise and fall of Beanie Babies' creator Ty Warner alongside the culture of collecting the successful toy line, and the birth of E-commerce and eBay with 12th employee Lina Trivedi	August 5, 2021	0.080
5	5	"Grunge & The Seattle Sound"	Seattle, Sub Pop Records and the start of the 1990s rock subgenre known as grunge.	August 12, 2021	0.081
6	6	"Baywatch: Sex Sells"	The popular TV series Baywatch and the controversies surrounding it (especially Pamela Anderson's sex tape with Tommy Lee).	August 19, 2021	0.160
7	7	"A Tale of Two Cults"	Coverage on both the Branch Davidians and Heaven's Gate cults.	August 26, 2021	0.086
8	8	"Hip Hop: The East Vs. West Media War"	The infamous East Coast-West Coast hip hop rivalry and the tragic consequences of it (the deaths of Tupac Shakur and Biggie Smalls).	September 2, 2021	0.099
9	9	"Secrets of The Runway"	The international success of supermodels and the dark secrets behind the scenes.	September 9, 2021	0.065
10	10	"Internet 1.0: Don't Believe the Hype"	The dot.com bubble during the Internet's early years.	September 16, 2021	0.077

=== Season 2 (2022) ===
No. overall	No. in season	Title	Subject(s)	Original release date	Viewers (millions)
11	1	"Arseniooo Hall!"	The success of The Arsenio Hall Show to younger audiences before its downfall, due to competition from Jay Leno and David Letterman, alongside a controversial episode featuring Nation of Islam leader Louis Farrakhan	June 14, 2022	N/A
12	2	"MTV & The Real World"	MTV's 1992 debut of reality TV sensation The Real World and its impact on the channel	June 21, 2022	N/A
13	3	"Cops: Bad Boys, Bad Boys"	The documentary TV show Cops featuring racial conflicts between white American police officers and lower class African-Americans.	June 28, 2022	N/A
14	4	"UFC Pt. 1: No Holds Barred"	The bloody "no rules" origin of Ultimate Fighting Championship.	July 5, 2022	N/A
15	5	"UFC Pt. 2: To Live or Die in the Octagon"	UFC survives multiple attempts to ban it and becomes a mainstream sport.	July 5, 2022	N/A
16	6	"Tabloid TV"	Tabloid journalism on television (Hard Copy and A Current Affair) and the salacious stories they uncovered (among them the Amy Fisher saga)	July 12, 2022	N/A
17	7	"Black Sitcoms' Last Laugh"	The successes of African-American sitcoms (Living Single, Martin and The Fresh Prince of Bel-Air) and In Living Color before falling into the pitfalls of fame.	July 19, 2022	N/A
18	8	"The Rise of Rush Limbaugh"	Rush Limbaugh is conservative talk radio's first megastar, claiming to have talent on loan from God as he created a divide in America that is still unfolding 30 years on.	July 26, 2022	N/A
19	9	"Y2K: Paranoia Will Destroy Ya"	At the end of the decade, the fear of an apocalypse looms (even for far-right militias) as two men become the stars of the real-life action thriller known as the Y2K scare.	August 2, 2022	N/A
20	10	"Morning Show Wars"	Morning TV is the profit center of the news divisions that produce them with The Today Show and Good Morning America battling for dominance where there's no room for failure.	August 9, 2022	N/A

=== Season 3 (2024) ===
No. overall	No. in season	Title	Subject(s)	Original release date	Viewers (millions)
21	1	"Tyson: The Rise and Fall of Kid Dynamite"	Mike Tyson reshaped boxing, became a pop culture sensation and was feared for his violence and seeming invincibility; but in the end, he'll face the greatest opponent of his life: himself.	July 16, 2024	N/A
22	2	"Friends: The One About The TV Show"	Friends was, in its heyday, must-see TV, but some of the cast struggle under the weight of sudden and massive fame with painfully public addictions and at least one near-death experience.	July 23, 2024	N/A
23	3	"NYPD Blue"	NYPD Blue forever changes TV with its use of nudity, violence and profanity, but heavy scrutiny from special interest groups would nearly get it cancelled before it ever even aired.	July 30, 2024	N/A
24	4	"Robert Downey Jr.: The Comeback Kid"	The turbulent life and times of Academy Award-winning actor Robert Downey Jr.	August 6, 2024	N/A
25	5	"SNL"	The legacy, tragedies and controversies behind the NBC comedy sketch series, Saturday Night Live, since its first airing in 1975.	August 13, 2024	N/A
26	6	"Infomercials: Shams and Scams"	The competitive world of TV infomercials	August 20, 2024	N/A
27	7	"Spice Girls"	The popular British girl group Spice Girls and the struggles behind the scenes	August 27, 2024	N/A
28	8	"Agassi & '90s Tennis Prodigies"	The turmoil of tennis superstar Andre Agassi and the struggles of other pro tennis players	September 3, 2024	N/A
29	9	"Scores Strip Club: Girls & Gambinos"	TBA	September 17, 2024	N/A
30	10	"Rave Culture: Under the Influence"	Rave music and the club culture's dark underbelly	September 24, 2024	N/A

== Production ==
The spin-off series was announced in December 2020, when Vice TV expanded the Dark Side franchise by ordering its spin-off series dedicated to 90s pop culture called Dark Side of the 90s with New York-based production studio Railspitter Pictures and Canadian production outfit Insight Productions producing the spin-off series.

== Reception ==
Reviews of Dark Side of the 90s on Rotten Tomatoes have been mostly negative, with many audience reviews accusing the documentary of corrupting the decade's history by sensationalizing less relevant events from the decade in order to make it seem like the 1990s was a more negative era than it actually was, and season 1 only holding a 50% audience approval.
