= Ty (company) =

Toy company founded by Ty Warner

Ty Inc.
- Logo
- Industry: Soft toys
- Founded: 1986; 40 years ago
- Founder: Ty Warner
- Headquarters: Oak Brook, Illinois, U.S.
- Number of locations: Worldwide
- Products: Beanie Babies, Beanie Boos, Frizzys, Disney, My Little Pony, Hello Kitty, TMNT, SpongeBob SquarePants, MLB, NBA, NHL, NFL, Rush Zone, PAW Patrol, Despicable Me, Beanie Ballz, Beanie Bellies
- Owner: Ty Warner
- Website: ty.com

Ty Inc. (styled ty) is an American multinational corporation headquartered in Oak Brook, Illinois, a suburb of Chicago. It was founded by Ty Warner in 1986. It designs, develops and sells products, most notably Beanie Babies, exclusively to retail markets worldwide.

== Internet ==
=== First "business-to-consumer" website ===
Lina Trivedi, the company's 12th employee, hired in 1992, was a college student when she worked at Ty Inc. In 1995, she approached Warner to talk about a new development that existed on college campuses called the Internet. She indicated that, while the Internet was primarily a research tool, college students were starting to make personal websites. She thought that creating a website for Beanie Babies could present an unprecedented opportunity to engage the market. She brought to Ty's office a 14.4k modem and demonstrated how the Internet works. Warner was intrigued and gave Trivedi a free license to create a website using her judgment and skills. By the time the first iteration of the Ty website was published in late 1995, only 1.4% of Americans were using the Internet. The population of people using the Internet grew exponentially in the following years, along with the popularity of Beanie Babies.

Ty was the first business to produce a direct-to-consumer website. This was a major contributing factor to the early and rapidly growing popularity of Beanie Babies. All Beanie Baby hangtags had the website URL and a call to action printed underneath the poems and birthdays that commanded audiences to visit the company website with text that read "Visit our web page!!!"

== Fundraising ==
Ty has been involved in a large amount of fundraising, with the proceeds donated to various causes. Some of this has been raised from the sale of certain Beanie Babies. It has also been raised through other means, such as voting for a fee.

One such fundraising Beanie Baby was Ariel, made to raise funds for the Elizabeth Glaser Pediatric AIDS Foundation. Its sales raised a total of $3.4 million for the foundation. Others include Aware and Awareness, sold to raise funds for breast cancer research and awareness; and Barbaro, created in memory of Barbaro the Horse, to raise funds for the University of Pennsylvania School of Veterinary Medicine, which tried to save the horse.

Ty has also raised money for the 2004 PGA Tour with a beanie called ChariTee; one, signed by Jack Nicklaus, was auctioned for $455.

Ty was the shirt sponsor of Portsmouth FC from 2002 to 2005, in which the club was promoted to the Premier League.

A Beanie Baby named "Cito" was given out to school children in Montecito, California, to welcome them back to school after the area was affected by the 2018 Southern California mudflows.

== In popular culture ==
During the wake of Beanie Babies' success, Beanie Baby-centric publications were issued. One of the largest was Mary Beth's Bean Bag World, a monthly magazine dedicated to Beanie Babies and competing plush toys. It ran from 1997 to 2001.

In August 2021, Beanie Babies was the season 1, episode 4 feature on Vice Media's Dark Side of the 90s entitled "Beanie Babies Go Bust".

A documentary film about Beanie Babies, titled Beanie Mania, was released on December 23, 2021, on HBO Max.

The story of Ty has also been covered by two films, both named The Beanie Bubble, one a 2022 documentary directed by Ben Kitnick and a 2023 comedy-drama directed by Kristin Gore and Damian Kulash and written by Gore, based on the 2015 book The Great Beanie Baby Bubble: Mass Delusion and the Dark Side of Cute by Zac Bissonnette about the Beanie Babies bubble. It stars Zach Galifianakis, Elizabeth Banks, Sarah Snook and Geraldine Viswanathan.

== Lawsuits ==
=== Copyright lawsuit ===
South Korean company Aurora World, Inc. filed a federal copyright lawsuit against Ty, alleging Ty's Beanie Boos toyline infringe on their YooHoo & Friends toyline. Among Aurora's claims: Ty is in violation of the Copyright Act, Lanham Act, section 17200 of the California Business and Professions Code; common law misappropriation; and common law unfair competition. Ty contends it did not intend to sell "Cleo" and "Bubblegum" in the United States of America. Ty also advised the court that the company had ceased sending out display racks and sell sheets containing images of "Cleo" and "Bubblegum".

Aurora's court documents include comparisons of YooHoo & Friends characters with "Bubblegum" and "Cleo" Beanie Boos. Through its court filings, Aurora says, "Ty's unlawful imitations of the YooHoo & Friends products and blatant infringement are damaging Aurora, not only by causing actual confusion and likelihood of confusion in the marketplace...but also by diminishing the value of the YooHoo & Friends products by diluting their distinct and unique nature and erroneously associating them with Ty rather than Aurora." A pre-trial was scheduled to begin on December 20, 2010.

In December 2011, the parties settled with a consent decree where Ty was permanently enjoined in the United States from selling the specific infringing Beanie Boo models, and Aurora was enjoined from making certain public statements about the litigation.
