= Retirement (Beanie Baby) =

Withdrawal of a Beanie Baby toy from production

The retirement of a Beanie Baby or a product from any line of Ty Inc., the manufacturer of Beanie Babies and other lines of collectibles, is its withdrawal from production. This has occurred in varying amounts of time following its introduction, depending on Ty's goals for that particular item. Some Beanie Babies have remained in production for several years following their introduction. Others have been retired just days after being introduced. Occasionally, beanies that have been introduced for a single purpose have been retired on the day they have been distributed. More rarely, some beanies have had their production canceled prior to their shipment to retailers, but following their announcement to the public, thereby never becoming available.

When a Beanie Baby is retired, it is no longer produced by Ty, though if Ty has some remaining in its stock, these may be shipped to retailers. While some Beanies were produced abundantly, thereby making them readily available in stores (authorized Ty retailers and the secondary market), other rarer ones have proven more scarce, and have been highly sought by collectors. These are often sold for high prices.

== Impact on value ==
During the time when they were popular (mostly in the late 1990s), when a Beanie Baby was retired, it resulted in the collectible's value rising, a rush by the public to purchase those remaining of the item from a place of retail, and increased sale prices on the second-hand market.

Since the popularity of Beanie Babies has declined in the 2000s, their retirement has not dramatically increased their value on the secondary market, and many authorized Ty retailers continue to carry Beanie Babies that were retired.

There are several reasons a Beanie Baby may retire: a) The Beanie Baby has been around long enough, (e.g. Bronty) b) There may be an error in the Beanie Baby.(e.g. Peanut (royal blue version) c) it was a Limited or Special edition Beanie Baby, such as a BBOM(Beanie Baby Of The Month) (e.g. Holiday Teddies) d) There may be too many complaints about it for a specific reason. (e.g. Runner) and e) There may be a lawsuit or upcoming lawsuit on the Beanie Baby from a different company for copying the name or design.

== Process ==
Retirements have typically been announced on Ty's website via a "newsflash." The newsflashes have generally announced that a beanie baby or a list thereof has just retired or is soon to retire. While some retirements have been officially announced several weeks in advance or otherwise anticipated by the public, others have come with. This give consumers an alert on a "last chance" to buy a certain beanie Baby in stores.

== Public vote of 1999 ==
The most significant mass retirement of all came late in 1999, when Ty announced that at the end of the year, all Beanie Babies would retire. This kept the public wondering whether or not more beanie babies would be introduced. At the end of the year, the public was given the opportunity to vote to determine if beanies should continue to be produced. There was a 50¢ fee to vote to prevent multiple votes by one person. Proceeds were donated to the Elizabeth Glaser Pediatric AIDS Foundation. About 90% of voters voted for Beanie Babies to continue, and more beanies were introduced early in 2000.

Late in 1999, following the complete retirement announcement, ten beanies were introduced that the public largely believed would be the final beanies. A few were named in honor of the seasonal occasions. But in particular, one of them was named "The End," which helped reinforce the public's belief that beanies may really end. The beanies introduced at this time included:

=== The End ===
One of the ten final beanies of 1999 was a black bear called "The End." It was this one in particular that gave the impression that beanies would be permanently discontinued at the start of the new millennium . As the poem in the hang tag read "All good things come to an end, it's been fun for everyone, peace and hope are never gone, love you all and say, so long," this served to reinforce the belief that Beanie Babies may permanently cease to be produced.

The final Teenie Beanie in the 2000 series was a miniature version of The End.

After Beanie Babies were not discontinued, a white bear with silver stars called "The Beginning" was introduced.

=== Ty2K ===
Ty2K the bear was named as a pun on the commonly used term Y2K that was often heard during the days approaching the turn on millennium. The beanie had a design of several colors of confetti on a white background, and was referred to as the "confetti bear."

In early 2000, a Beanie Buddy version of Ty2K was introduced, but it only had three colors of confetti. The Ty2K buddy retired quickly, and was considered by collectors to be rare.

=== Others ===
Some of the others introduced for a brief period in the final months of 1999 included:

- Chipper the chipmunk
- Scaly the lizard
- Honks the goose

== Forced retirements ==
Some beanie babies were forced into their retirement earlier than Ty had planned for various reasons, including legal orders.

=== Roary the lion ===
Roary was the first Beanie Baby lion made by Ty. It was produced from May 1997 through December 1998. Shortly before Roary retired, a federal judge ruled that its name violated the rights of the Imperial Toy Corporation, which produced a similar plush lion named Roarie, and therefore, its production must stop. Eventually, Roary's look and personality were re-released in 2000 as Bushy the Beanie Baby.

=== Tabasco the bull ===
"Tabasco" is also the trademarked name given by the Tabasco sauce company. Because of this, Tabasco was retired to avoid lawsuits by the company that makes Tabasco sauce. Tabasco is one of the first post-Spring 1996 beanies to be prematurely retired, when its replacement, Snort, was introduced to take its place.

=== Doodle the rooster ===
Doodle was renamed Strut the rooster due to a lawsuit that was filed by Chick-fil-A. Strut was made to look identical. Unlike Dotty and Snort the Beanie Babies, no design change accompanied his introduction.

=== Sparky the dalmatian ===
Sparky was retired because "Sparky" was the trademarked name and mascot of the National Fire Protection Association. It was officially out of production when Dotty the Beanie Baby was introduced to take its place.

=== Chops the lamb ===
Chops was the first lamb produced. It was retired one year after its release, apparently due to complaints about the late Shari Lewis' popular puppet, Lamb Chop.
