= Kristin Gore =

American author, screenwriter, and director (born 1977)

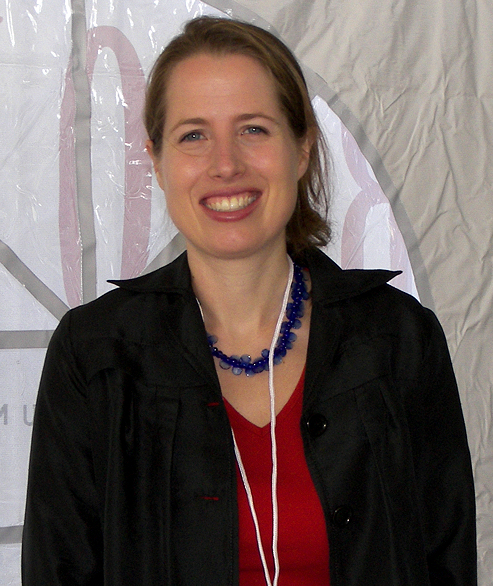
- Gore in 2007
- Born: Kristin Carlson Gore; June 5, 1977 (age 49); Carthage, Tennessee, U.S.
- Education: Harvard University (BA)
- Occupations: Author; screenwriter; director
- Spouses: Paul Cusack (m. 2005; div. 2009) Damian Kulash (m. 2016)
- Children: 2
- Parent(s): Al Gore (father); Tipper Gore (mother)
- Relatives: Karenna Gore (sister)

Kristin Carlson Gore (born June 5, 1977) is an American author, screenwriter, and director. She is the second daughter of former U.S. vice president Al Gore and advocate Tipper Gore (née Aitcheson).

== Early life ==
Gore was born in Carthage, Tennessee on June 5, 1977, the second child of Tipper and Al Gore. She has three siblings: sisters Karenna and Sarah, and brother Albert III. She was raised in Washington, D.C. and graduated from National Cathedral School in 1995 and Harvard University in 1999. While at Harvard, she was an editor for The Harvard Lampoon, and until her senior year she was the only woman on its literary board.

== Career ==
Gore has published three novels, Sammy's Hill (2004), Sammy's House (2007), and Sweet Jiminy (2011). She co-wrote the screenplay for the 2015 film Accidental Love and the narration for the 2007 documentary Arctic Tale. She has also been a writer for the long-running sketch comedy series Saturday Night Live and the animated sitcom Futurama, a show in which her father had a minor recurring role as a guest voice-actor playing himself.

In 1999, Gore sang backup vocals on a Diva Zappa comedy single called "When The Ball Drops" about Zappa's "hunt for someone to make out with on the Millennium". Tipper Gore played drums on the recording.

In 2013, she worked on Spike Jonze's film Her. Gore has written a screenplay called Racing Dreams, with Lance Acord attached to direct.

She wrote and co-directed the 2023 comedy-drama film The Beanie Bubble alongside her husband, Damian Kulash.

== Personal life ==
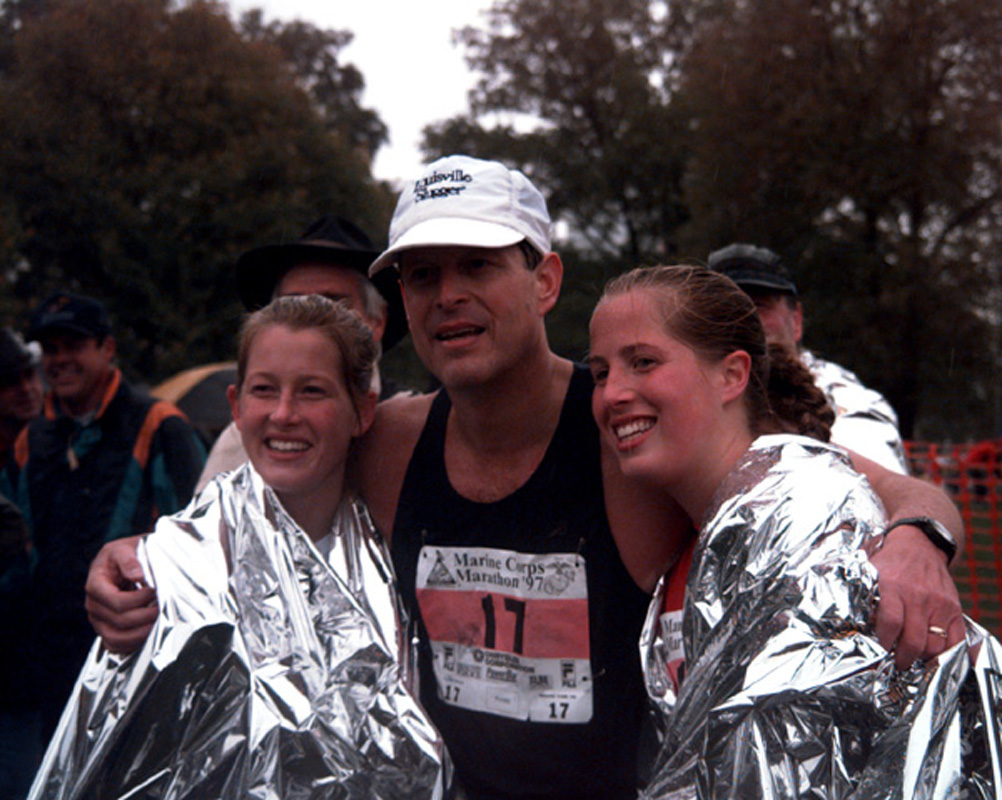
Kristen Gore (right) with father Al and sister Karenna in 1997

Gore married Paul Cusack, a former district director for former Massachusetts United States Representative Marty Meehan, in 2005. The couple divorced in 2009. Since 2016, Gore has been married to musician Damian Kulash. They have two children.

== Works ==
Books

- Sammy's Hill (2005)
- Sammy's House (2007)
- Sweet Jiminy (2011)

Film

- Accidental Love (2015), screenplay
- The Beanie Bubble (2023), screenplay
