= Beanie Babies =

American brand of stuffed toys

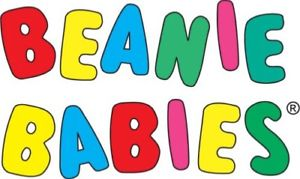
- Type: Stuffed toy
- Invented by: Ty
- Company: Ty Inc.
- Country: United States
- Availability: 1993–present
- Materials: Synthetic plush, polyvinyl chloride, polyester fiber
- ty.com

Beanie Babies are a line of stuffed toys created by American businessman Ty Warner, who founded Ty Inc. in 1986. The toys are stuffed with plastic pellets ("beans") rather than conventional soft stuffing and come in many different forms, mostly animals. Beanie Babies emerged as a major fad and collectible during the second half of the 1990s. They have been cited as being the world's first Internet sensation. They were collected not only as toys, but also as a financial investment due to their high resale value.

== History ==
Warner introduced Beanie Babies in 1993 at the North American International Toy Fair/World Toy Fair in New York City, New York. Manufacturing began in 1994, and the toys were first sold in stores in Chicago, Illinois for around 5 U.S. Dollars. There were nine original Beanie Babies: Legs the Frog, Squealer the Pig, Spot the Dog, Flash the Dolphin, Splash the Whale, Chocolate the Moose, Patti the Platypus, Brownie the Bear (later renamed Cubbie), and Pinchers the Lobster (with some tags misprinted "Punchers"). Ty, Inc. has allowed only small toy or gift stores to sell Beanie Babies.

Sales were slow at first. By 1995 many retailers refused to buy the bundles the toys were offered in; other retailers refused to buy Beanie Babies. Around the same time, Ty, Inc. began restricting production and distribution: stores could buy only 36 of each character per month. Warner also decided to "retire" characters after a certain period of time, meaning their production would eventually cease. The resulting scarcity led to a significant increase in sales, and it started the trend of collecting and reselling Beanie Babies. Their popularity soon grew into a national craze in the US.

In 1996, Ty, Inc. released Teenie Beanies, a line of miniature Beanie Babies. They were sold alongside McDonald's Happy Meals to celebrate the Happy Meal's 17th anniversary. They also partnered with other companies.

Ty, Inc. announced that they would stop making Beanie Babies in December 1999, but high demand soon led them to reconsider. Production restarted in 2000 with a Beanie Baby named "The Beginning."

In early 2008, Ty released a new version of Beanie Babies called Beanie Babies 2.0. The purchase of a Beanie Baby 2.0 provided its owner with a code to access an online Beanie Babies interactive website. However, the website has since been shut down.

== Design ==
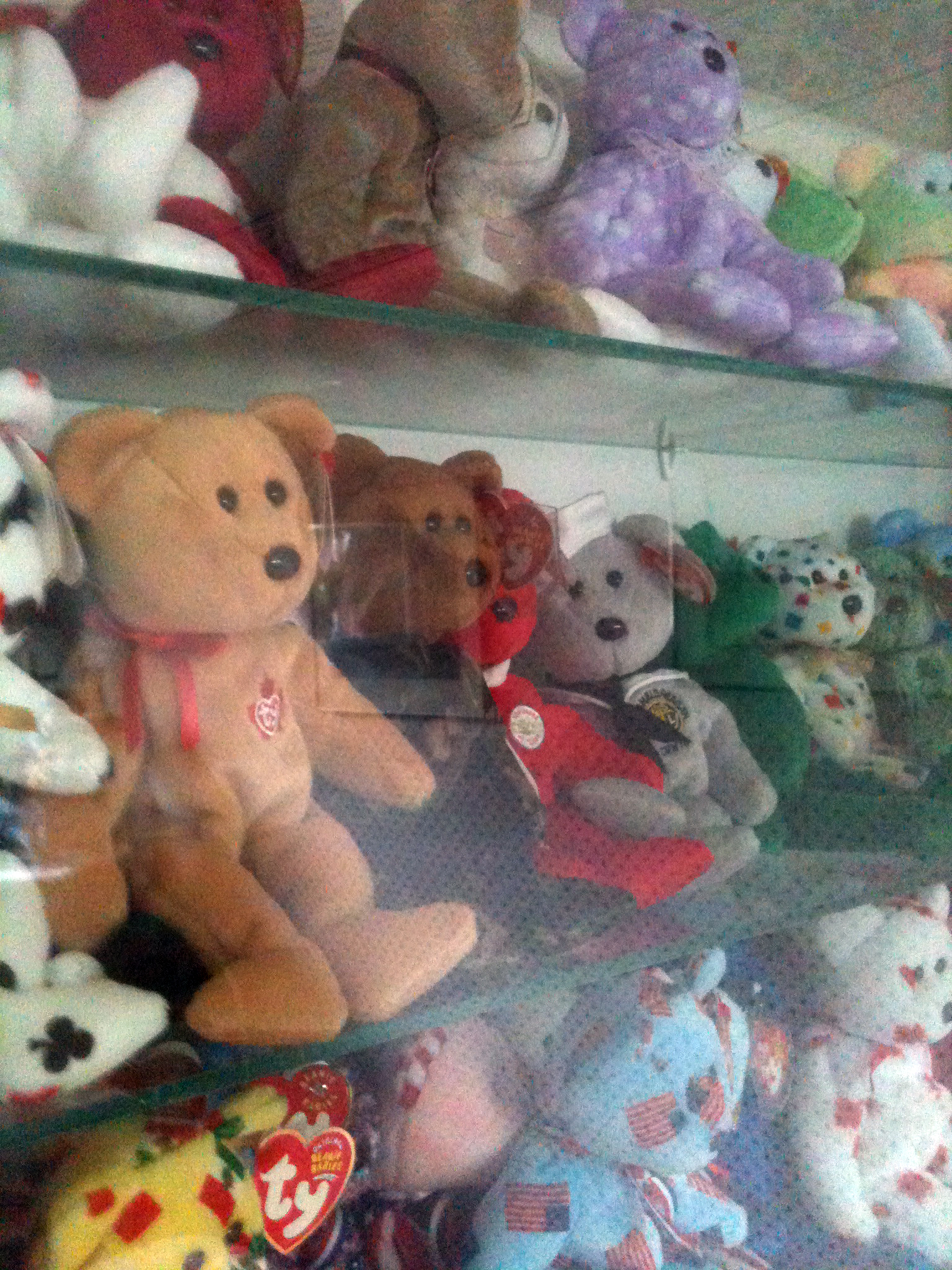
A collection of Beanie Babies

Beanie Babies are deliberately under-stuffed. This led to a criticism that the toys looked "cheap"; however, this set them apart from most stuffed animals on the market which could not be posed easily. Ty Warner has said that this understuffing method made the toys look "real and posable, Rather than rigid stuffed animals".

Another important design element is the tag. Since the beginning, Beanie Babies have included two tags for identification: a heart-shaped "swing tag" at the top, and a fabric "tush tag" at the bottom. Both tags have been redesigned completely over time. Between 1994 and 1996, the swing tags had "To" and "From" blanks in them for use as gifts. Starting in early 1996, the tags include four-line poems related to the Beanie Baby, and a date of birth for the toy. The poem and birthday concept was created by Lina Trivedi, who is credited as authoring the poems on the first 136 Beanie Babies that were introduced to the marketplace.

It was not uncommon for Beanie Babies to be accidentally shipped out with incorrect or misspelled tags, which sometimes increased the toy's value. On occasion, the poems, birth dates and even the names have been changed on certain Beanie Babies.

== Marketing ==
Early on, Ty had trouble finding retailers to order Beanie Babies. To get small retailers to stock the product, Ty introduced Beanie Babies at the 1993 Toy Fair in New York City. This event helped garner attention for the set of plush toys. In 1994, small local stores in Chicago, Illinois, began selling Beanie Babies for around five US dollars.

Early in 1995, Ty created the first iteration of the Ty website, the first business-to-consumer website designed to sell to consumers directly. To go along with the launch of the Ty website in 1995, all Beanie Baby hangtags were printed with the Ty website URL and a new piece of text was added with the company's name and the following message "Visit our website". As a result, many consumers visited Ty's website for more information on Beanie Babies. This endeavor would mark the beginning of the Beanie Babies boom.

Later in 1995, Ty was forced to end production on the popular toy Lovie the Lamb, owing to an issue with suppliers in China. CEO Ty Warner came up with the solution to tell retailers that Lovie was merely discontinued, and even suggested that many other Beanie Babies would be discontinued as well. This news would spread via word of mouth, as motivated sellers began to stock up on Ty plush toys while they still could, thus creating a new demand for Beanie Babies. The mismatch between supply and demand lead consumers to buy Beanie Babies in bulk from the Ty website to relist them on auction sites for highly inflated prices.

== Collectibility ==
Beanie Babies began to emerge as popular collectibles in late 1995, and became a hot toy. The company's strategy of deliberate scarcity, producing each new design in limited quantity, restricting individual store shipments to limited numbers of each design and regularly retiring designs created a huge secondary market for the toys and increased their popularity and value as a collectible.

Ty Inc. would systematically retire various designs, and many people assumed that all "retired" designs would rise in value the way that early retirees had. The craze lasted through 1999 and slowly declined after the Ty company announced that they would no longer be making Beanie Babies and made a bear called "The End". Some time after the original announcement that the company would stop production, Ty asked the public to vote on whether the product should continue; fans and collectors voted "overwhelmingly" to keep the toys on the market.

At its height of popularity people would flip Beanies for as much as ten-fold on eBay. At their height, Beanies made up 10% of eBay's sales. Some collectors insured their purchases for thousands of dollars.

The following are key factors that contributed to the collectible nature of Beanie Babies:

- Unique creative elements – each product contained a unique birthday and poem that was printed on the tag of every Beanie Baby.
- Scarcity – Supply fell short of product demand.
- Availability – Beanie Babies were initially only sold in individually-owned small gift and specialty shops.
- New releases and retirements – Several times a year, Ty Inc. would retire certain Beanie Baby characters and the production of said characters would cease to make room for new designs.

Warner was keenly aware that the Beanie Babies bubble could burst and eventually started requiring retailers who sold Beanies to also stock other product lines by his company if they wished to continue selling Beanies. None of these lines did as well as Beanie Babies, although they kept the company alive after the fad ended, and eventually some became successful in their own right.

== Internet ==
Ty, Inc. was the first business to produce a business to consumer website designed to engage their market. This was a major contributing factor to the early, rapidly growing popularity of Beanie Babies. By the time the first iteration of the Ty website was published in late 1995 (by Lina Trivedi), only 1.4% of Americans were using the Internet. In tandem with the launch of the Ty Website in 1995, all Beanie Baby hangtags had the Ty Website URL and a call to action printed underneath the poems and birthdays that commanded audiences to visit the company website with text that read: "Visit our web page!!" As a result, hordes of consumers were visiting the Ty website to gain information about Beanie Babies, which was unprecedented for the time. Ty Inc. was the first business to leverage their website to connect and engage with consumers of their products. This effort evolved into the world's first Internet sensation.

== Counterfeit Beanie Babies ==
Counterfeit Beanie Babies began to surface in 1997. Early on, inexpensive copies and fakes of common Beanies were widely available at discount prices.

Authorities cracked down on counterfeit Beanie Babies in the late 1990s. People were prosecuted for their involvement in the commerce of counterfeit Beanies. In late 1997 and early 1998, US Customs confiscated more than 17,000 counterfeit Beanie Babies at Chicago and Orlando airports. In 1998, UK authorities seized more than 6,000 counterfeit Princesses and Britannias. In 1999, a Minnesota man was imprisoned, fined, and put on probation for involvement in smuggling counterfeit Beanies.

== Media ==
During the wake of Beanie Babies' success, Beanie Baby-centric publications were issued. One of the largest was Mary Beth's Bean Bag World, a monthly magazine dedicated to Beanie Babies and competing plush toys. It ran from 1997 to 2001.

In August 2021, Beanie Babies had a feature on season 1, episode 4 of Vice Media's Dark Side of the 90's, titled "Beanie Babies Go Bust".

A documentary film about Beanie Babies, titled Beanie Mania, was released on HBO Max in December 2021.

In July 2023, Apple TV+ released a comedy-drama film titled The Beanie Bubble, based on Zac Bissonnette's 2015 book The Great Beanie Baby Bubble: Mass Delusion and the Dark Side of Cute.

== Licensed Beanies ==
In the late 2000s, Beanie Babies modeled after characters from popular children's franchises by Nickelodeon, DreamWorks and Paramount began appearing. These included characters from cartoons on the Nickelodeon television channel such as SpongeBob SquarePants, Dora the Explorer, Blue's Clues and The Backyardigans, as well as characters from DreamWorks Animation movies such as Shrek the Third, and 20th Century Fox's Ice Age: Dawn of the Dinosaurs. Beanie Babies have also been produced for characters from Legend of the Guardians: The Owls of Ga'Hoole and the Guardians of Ga'Hoole book series, Scooby-Doo, Hello Kitty, and Peanuts. Recently Beanie Babies modeled after Disney characters have been created, including Mickey Mouse, Minnie Mouse, Winnie the Pooh, and Olaf from Frozen. In addition, Ty Inc. has produced Beanie Baby toys based on characters from the Disney Junior TV series Doc McStuffins, Pixar films like Cars and Finding Dory, and Marvel Comics superheroes. Ty Inc. has also partnered with Universal Pictures, Sony Pictures Animation, and Hasbro to make Beanie Babies of characters from franchises such as Despicable Me, Sing, and My Little Pony. Ty Inc. has also expanded their Nickelodeon Beanie Babies lineup with characters from PAW Patrol, Teenage Mutant Ninja Turtles and Peppa Pig.

== Charity donations ==
Warner has donated over $300 million to various charities since the start of the company. In January 2020, the Beanie Baby "Katy the Koala" was released. Ty announced that 100% of the profits from the sale of Katy would go to the Australian-based animal rescue organisation WIRES (Wildlife Information, Rescue and Education Service Inc.). In April 2020, H. Ty Warner pledged that 100% of profits from the sale of a limited edition Beanie Baby bear named "Hope" were to be donated to the United Way Worldwide COVID-19 Fund.

In 2021, Warner released "Max" the dog Beanie Baby, from which all proceeds were donated to Next for Autism.

On March 2, 2022, Warner declared all profits from the sales of Beanie Babies during the month of March would be donated to Save the Children, an organization providing emergency assistance to those in Ukraine.

The next year, Warner released the "Aloha" Beanie Baby, a bear that had a "Maui Strong" emblem. Proceeds from sales of Aloha were donated to the American Red Cross in support of the organisation's Maui wildfire relief.

== See also ==
- Beanie Babies 2.0
- Cabbage Patch Kids
- Tickle Me Elmo
- Furby
- Chia Pet
- Economic bubble
- Labubu
- Non-fungible token
- Pet Rock
- Puffkins
- Sock monkey
- Tulip mania
- Uglydoll
