= Ty Warner =

American businessman (born 1944)

- Born: H Ty Warner; September 3, 1944 (age 82); Chicago, Illinois, U.S.
- Education: Kalamazoo College
- Occupation: Businessman
- Years active: 1993–present
- Known for: Founding Ty Inc., Beanie Babies

H Ty Warner (born September 3, 1944) is an American billionaire businessman. He is the CEO, sole owner, and co-founder of Ty Inc. which manufactures and distributes stuffed toys, notably Beanie Babies. He also owns Four Seasons Hotel New York, which he bought with profits from the 1990s Beanie Babies fad. As of March 2025, he ranked 519 on the Forbes Billionaires list, with a net worth of US$6.4 billion.

== Early life and education ==
Warner was born on September 3, 1944, in Chicago, Illinois, and he grew up in suburban La Grange, in a Prairie-style house designed in the early 1890s by Frank Lloyd Wright, now known as the Peter Goan House. His father was Harold "Hal" Warner, a jeweler and toy salesman. His mother was Georgia Warner, a pianist. He has a much younger sister, Joyce. He was named after baseball player Ty Cobb.

At age 14, Warner attended Lyons Township High School (north campus) in La Grange, Illinois, before transferring to St. John's Military Academy in Delafield, Wisconsin, from which he graduated in 1962. Warner attended Kalamazoo College for one year.

== Career ==
=== 1980–1993 ===
Warner moved to Los Angeles to start a career in acting. He had little success and returned to Chicago after five years. There he began working for plush toy maker Dakin as a salesman, the same company where his father worked. In 1980, he was fired by Dakin, reportedly for selling his own products to established customers in competition with the company's line. After spending a three-year sabbatical in Italy, Warner returned to Chicago.

In 1986, he mortgaged his home and invested his life savings and a bequest from his father into founding Ty Inc. Warner started out selling stuffed toy cats (inspired by some plush he had seen in Italy).

=== 1993–2004 ===
In 1993, Ty Inc. launched Beanie Babies, a series of small plush toys shaped like various animals. He focused on selling the $5 or $10 Beanie Babies to small independent toy stores rather than large retailers like Toys R Us, Target, or Walmart, preferring to have multiple small clients rather than a handful of large ones. He drove up demand by artificially restricting items shipped to each store below requested orders, and by creating deliberate shortages by discontinuing old items and introducing new ones in an essentially arbitrary manner rather than the more common toy industry pattern of releasing new items once or twice a year. A secondary market developed when collectors began reselling the toys at greatly inflated prices, and various books, magazines, and accessories like carrying cases devoted to Beanie Babies appeared. At the peak of the Beanie craze circa 1999, the privately owned Ty Inc. is believed to have earned over $700 million in profits in a year. The Beanie Babies phenomenon, coupled with the rise of the Internet, is cited as elevating Warner to billionaire status with a net worth of over $2.5 billion.

=== 2004–present ===
Warner also has significant investments in hotels, property and golf courses. Ty Warner Hotels and Resorts include the Four Seasons Hotel in New York City; the Sandpiper Golf Course in Santa Barbara, California; the San Ysidro Ranch in Montecito, California; the Four Seasons Resort The Biltmore in Santa Barbara, California, purchased in 2000; the Kona Village resort in Hawaii, purchased in July 2004; the Montecito Country Club; and the Las Ventanas al Paraiso Resort in Los Cabos, Mexico, purchased in September 2004. In 2005, Warner also bought the beachfront Miramar resort and Rancho San Marcos golf course but sold the Miramar hotel in 2007 to Caruso Affiliated.

== Philanthropy ==
Warner has donated in excess of $6 million to the Andre Agassi Foundation for underprivileged children in Las Vegas and $3 million for the creation of Ty Warner Park in Westmont, Illinois. He also donated $1.5 million for the creation of the Ty Warner Sea Center in Santa Barbara, California, and donated one million Beanie Babies for children in Iraq. Warner also donated more than $300 million worth of soft toys for a Red Cross blood drive. Additionally, Warner has designed a number of Beanie Babies with the intention of donating all of the profits to charity. Ty Inc.'s charity releases have raised millions for a variety of charities, including the Elizabeth Glaser Pediatric AIDS Foundation, the American Red Cross, and the Princess Diana Memorial Fund.

In 2006, he received the Children's Champion Award from Children's Hunger Fund for his philanthropic efforts—Ty Inc. donated 1 million Beanie Babies to Children's Hunger Fund relief efforts in Iraq and Afghanistan.

In 2012, Warner stopped a woman and asked for directions in Santa Barbara, California. The woman was trying to raise money for a stem-cell procedure she needed to save her life. After learning of her condition, he gave her $20,000 for the procedure.

== Tax evasion ==
In 2014, Warner was sentenced to two years of probation plus community service for tax evasion. Since 1996, he had maintained a secret offshore account in Switzerland with UBS, which according to the prosecution concealed at one time $107 million. Later, Warner used Zurcher Kantonalbank to maintain his offshore account. His philanthropic activities were considered when sentencing him and he paid a $53 million fine.

Warner had tried to take advantage of the IRS tax amnesty that was offered in the wake of the UBS 2008–2010 tax scandal, but the government refused to accept him. His lawyers, including former IRS Deputy Commissioner Mark M. Matthews who is now a Member of Caplin & Drysdale, used the "Olenicoff Defense" to convince the judge that Warner did not deserve the year-and-one-day prison sentence recommended by prosecutors. The defense was based on the government's treatment of Igor Olenicoff, a California real estate tycoon. The lawyers cited Olenicoff for getting off without a jail sentence when he was sentenced for tax evasion via offshore accounts.

Warner's pre-sentencing report that called for a jail sentence said his offshore account was the biggest ever found. In fact, the lawyers pointed out, Olenicoff had $240 million stashed offshore. The Olenicoff defense worked. On January 14, 2014, District Court Judge Charles P. Kocoras sentenced Warner to two years' probation and 500 hours of community service. The judge rejected the prosecution's recommendation for jail time of one year and one day, to serve as a deterrent to other tax cheats. Olenicoff, who also got two years' probation and community service, pleaded guilty to filing a false tax return—a felony. Warner pleaded guilty to the more serious charge of tax evasion.

== Personal life ==
Warner maintains a low public profile, rarely granting media interviews or releasing personal or company information.

== See also ==
- The World's Billionaires
