= Fred Dallmayr =

American philosopher (1928–2024)

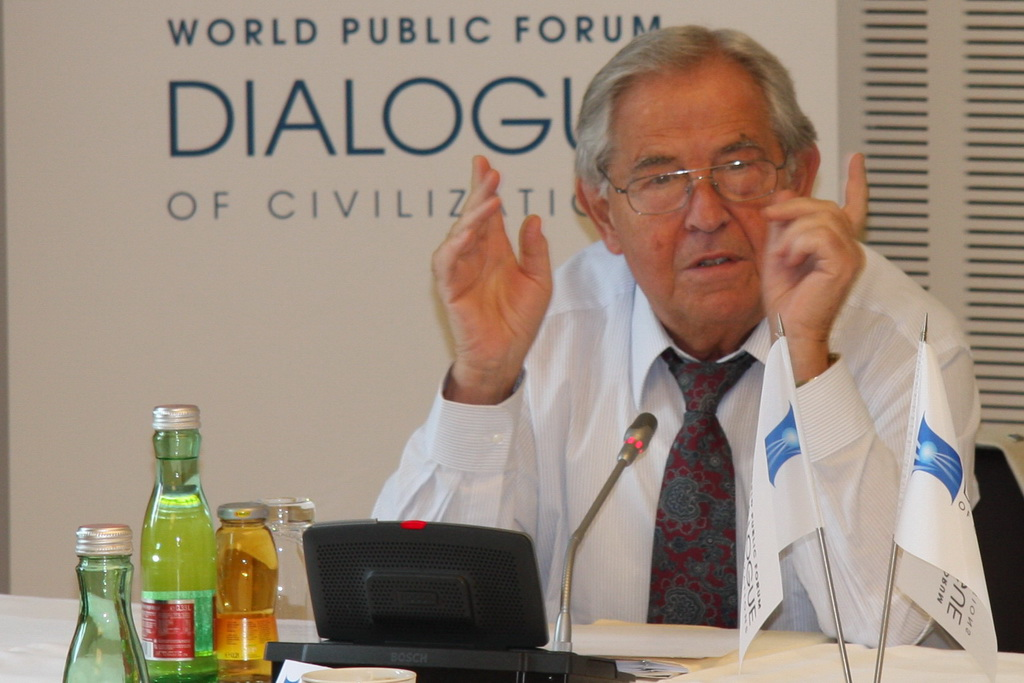
- Born: October 18, 1928; Ulm, Württemberg, Germany
- Died: June 5, 2024 (aged 95); South Bend, Indiana, U.S.

Philosophical work
- Era: Contemporary philosophy
- Region: American philosophy
- Main interests: contemporary philosophy and political theory, phenomenology, hermeneutics, critical theory, deconstruction, intercultural philosophy, and non-Western philosophical and political thought

Winfried Reinhard "Fred" Dallmayr (October 18, 1928 – June 5, 2024) was an American philosopher and political theorist. He was Packey J. Dee Professor Emeritus in Political Science with a joint appointment in philosophy at the University of Notre Dame (US). He held a Doctor of Law from the Ludwig-Maximilians-Universität München (LMU), and a PhD in political science from Duke University. He was the author of some 40 books and the editor of 20 other books. He served as president of the Society for Asian and Comparative Philosophy (SACP); an advisory member of the scientific committee of RESET – Dialogue on Civilizations (Rome); the executive co-chair of World Public Forum – Dialogue of Civilizations (Vienna), and a member of the supervisory board of the Dialogue of Civilizations Research Institute (Berlin).

== Biography ==
Dallmayr was born on October 18, 1928, in Ulm, Germany, and raised in Augsburg, Germany. World War II had a profound impact on his intellectual and political development. “I feel that, in large measure, I can trace my persistent opposition to war and violence—especially aggressive warfare—to this youthful experience.”

In 1955, he received the degree of Doctor of Law from the Ludwig-Maximilians-Universität München (LMU). In 1954–1957, he attended the Institute of European Studies (Istituto Universitario di Studi Europei) in Turin, Italy, under the mentorship of Norberto Bobbio. In 1955–1956, he studied at Southern Illinois University in Carbondale, Illinois, US. In 1957, he was admitted to Duke University, North Carolina, US, taking the PhD in political science in 1960.

Dallmayr taught at Purdue University as an assistant professor and associate professor (1963–1971), and then as professor and head of department of political science (1973–1978). Since 1978, he taught at Notre Dame, where he served as Packey J. Dee Professor of Government. He was a visiting professor at the University of Hamburg, Germany (1971–72, 1976, and 1986). He has also been Werner Marx Visiting Professor in philosophy at the New School for Social Research in New York (1988), a Fellow at Nuffield College, Oxford, and a Fulbright research scholar, at the Maharaja Sayajirao University of Baroda (MSU), Vadodara, Gujarat, India (1991–1992).

During trips to India, China, Japan, Malaysia, Turkey, Egypt, and other countries, Dallmayr established close collaborative relationships with many prominent philosophers and has been able to learn in-depth their cultural and philosophical traditions. He has maintained dialogues with philosophers such as Jürgen Habermas, Hans-Georg Gadamer, Jacques Derrida, and Michel Foucault, as well as Karl-Otto Apel, William McBride, Seyla Benhabib, Iris Marion Young, David M. Rasmussen, Judith Butler, Bhikhu Parekh, Ashis Nandy, and Tu Weiming, among others.

Dallmayr died in South Bend, Indiana on June 5, 2024, at the age of 95.

== Major philosophical themes ==
Dallmayr's research interests included contemporary philosophy and political theory; especially phenomenology; hermeneutics; critical theory; deconstruction; democratic theory; intercultural philosophy; and non-Western philosophical and political thought. He has written on G. W. F. Hegel, Martin Heidegger, Gadamer, Maurice Merleau-Ponty, Theodor W. Adorno; Jürgen Habermas, Karl-Otto Apel, Louis Althusser, Foucault, Derrida, Paul Tillich, Raimon Panikkar, and Enrique Dussel. Dallmayr's philosophy is characterized by the transformative impulse, fostering both the change that takes place in the development of philosophy and the role of philosophy in understanding and transforming human beings in their cultural manifestations and in social interactions.

Dallmayr's philosophy and political theory favors self-other relations over ego, dialogue over monologue, relationality over static identity, ethical conduct over the abstract knowledge of normative rules, equal democratic lateral relationships over hierarchies of domination, and intercultural and cosmopolitan perspectives over chauvinistic hegemonism. He has been a critic of liberal democracy, and has elucidated alternative conceptions of “apophatic” democracy or “democracy to come.”

As an alternative to the dichotomies of Western philosophy, Dallmayr's overall perspective aimed to steer a course between universalism and particularism, between globalism and localism, between Western modernity and tradition, and between Western and non-Western traditions of philosophical and religious thought. He firmly upheld the transcendent or trans-mundane status of the ideas of truth, goodness and justice, while simultaneously insisting on the need to interpret these ideas and to translate them into a commitment to justice and peace among people in this world.

In developing his philosophy, Dallmayr acknowledged his debt to phenomenology, hermeneutics, critical theory, and deconstructionism. From his earliest works, Dallmayr has consistently confronted Cartesian cogito and its oppositions (subject and object, human being and world). He criticizes the egocentrism of modern Western thought, including its “anthropocentric and subjectivist thrust” and “possessive individualism.” Yet this critique does not mean anti-humanism and the “end of man,” as advocated by some postmodern thinkers. He does not disregard the individual subject, but rather revises it as an emergent and relational being capable of transformation. To the metaphysical paradigm rooted in individual subjectivity he opposes the emerging outlook emphasizing human connectedness, anchored in (Heideggerian) “care” (Sorge) and “solicitude” (Fürsorge). Dallmayr outlines a post-individualist theory of politics, which does not simply reject individualism but seeks to divest it of its anthropocentric, “egological,” and “possessive” connotations. Dieter Misgeld noted that Dallmayr has “a post-individualist theory of politics and post-liberal moral and political thinking as his themes, as well as a theory of embodied intersubjectivity meant to be foundational for a theory of politics.”

=== Dallmayr on Heidegger ===
Dallmayr's brings an original interpretation of Heidegger's works. He was among the first in the English-speaking world to realize that Heidegger's philosophical work “was much broader than the particular Nazi episode.” He has elucidated Heidegger's work in several of his own major works. He uncovered fruitful contributions of Heidegger's work, which are relevant to contemporary social and political thought. He also delineated the contours of an alternative political perspective in Heidegger's thought.

Dallmayr highlights the importance of Heidegger's critique of Western metaphysics, especially Cartesian rationalism with its focus on the cogito, which was the root of the split between mind and matter, subject and object, self and other, humans and the world. In contrast to these divisions, Heidegger's definition of human existence as being-in-the-world conceptualizes “world” in its many dimensions as a constitutive feature of existence as such. In opposition to traditional formulations, being could not be grasped as a substance or fixed concept but needs to be seen as a temporal process or happening, an ongoing disclosure (and sheltering) of meaning in which all beings participate.

With Heidegger, Dallmayr goes beyond the self-centered type of existentialism. He interprets Dasein (human existence) in Being and Time as not a self-constituted or a fixed substance, but open-ended and potentially transformative, “a being moved by ‘care’ (Sorge) in an ongoing search for meaning and truth.”

He also explicates Heidegger’s other key concepts, such as letting-be (Seinlassen), event (Ereignis), and dwelling (wohnen), to move his political philosophy beyond the traditional paradigm, rooted in individual subjectivity, toward a view of human beings and society that emphasizes human connectedness and relationality. Above all, he shows that for Heidegger every substance is marked by division, every unity or community by “difference” (Unterschied). The central issue is how togetherness and separation, unity and difference “belong together.”

Dallmayr relates what he learns from Heidegger to political philosophy, asking questions, such as: “What is the status of individualism and of traditional Western humanism?” and “How should one construe the relations between self and other human beings bypassing the options of contractual agreement and simple rational convergence?” He focuses on the status of the individual as political agent; the character of the political community; the issue of cultural and political development or modernization; and the problem of an emerging cosmopolis, or world order, beyond the confines of Western culture.

He articulates from a philosophical perspective the relevance of Heidegger's diagnosis of the condition of contemporary society characterized by mass culture, the depersonalized “they” (das Man), the instrumental reason, oppressive power (Macht) and manipulative domination or machination (Machenschaft). Dallmayr shows the relevance of Heidegger as a thinker who was able to realize the dramatic situation of Western civilization and to see the root causes of its problems, which continued to escalate ever since. The qualitatively new perspective, highlighted by Dallmayr, is that contradictions and perilous tendencies in Western society are now escalating to the level of being global problems, which put us at the precipice of self-destruction—nuclear or ecological.

=== Dialogue and intercultural philosophy ===
Dallmayr saw the problems of Western modernity in the monologic mindset, which was rooted in Cartesian ego cogito and became an instrumental rationality coupled with egocentric will to power and domination. He advocated for dialogue in theory and practice, as a means to overcome monologic unilateralism and for establishing the relationships of mutual understanding and collaboration, aiming for peaceful coexistence and justice. He has elucidated the dialogical motifs in the works of Mikhail Mikhailovich Bakhtin, Gadamer, Karl Jaspers, Emmanuel Levinas, Maurice Merleau-Ponty, and Panikkar, among others.

Starting with the etymology of the word “dialogue,” which comes from the Greek and is composed of two parts: “dia” and “logos,” Dallmayr explains that “dia-logue” means that reason or meaning is not the monopoly of one party but emerges in the intercourse or communication between parties or agents. In the twentieth century, the turn towards dialogue can be seen as part and parcel of the so-called linguistic turn. He writes, “Associated prominently with the names of Wittgenstein, Heidegger, Gadamer, and Bakhtin, this turn has placed into the foreground the necessarily ‘relational’ or dialogical character of human thought and conduct.” In his words, dialogue means to approach alien meanings of life-forms in a questioning mode conducive to a possible learning experience. In the political arena, this turn has led to the re-invigoration of the public sphere and the expansion of the public domain in a global and cross-cultural direction.

Dallmayr believed in the fundamental character of dialogue and its indispensability for a proper human interaction. He emphasized Gadamer’s idea that every inter-personal encounter and every interpretation of texts involves dialogue in search for the meaning, and that the ethical precondition to genuine dialogue is to have good will and the recognition of the other as equal. As Dallmayr pointed out in an interview with Ghencheh Tazmini, “Genuine dialogue requires not only talking but a great deal of listening”. He stresses the importance of an authentic dialogue and elaborates on Panikkar's conception of “dialogical dialogue” and interreligious dialogue.

His appreciation of the dialogical trends in Western thought served as “possible springboards to broader, cross-cultural or trans-cultural explorations.” Dallmayr broadened his intercultural horizon through engagement in dialogue with the philosophical traditions of India, China, and the Islamic world. His encounters with Eastern philosophical cultures resulted in a transformative turn in Dallmayr's philosophical path. This strengthened his critical views of Eurocentric self-enclosure, anthropocentrism, and cognitive self-sufficiency. At the same time, it deepened his appreciation of the best in Europe's philosophical traditions. This helped to the development of his intercultural philosophy.

=== Cross-cultural political theory ===
Dallmayr was engaged in rethinking some of the central concepts of Western political philosophy. He challenged the predominance of a “subjectivity” and anthropocentric individualism, articulating alternative post-individualist or post-egocentric conceptions of selfhood and of politics as relational praxis. He elaborated on the post-anthropocentric and relational conception of the political community, viewing it as a differentiated wholeness combining both freedom and solidarity.

He contributed to the development of “critical phenomenology.” In Kenneth Colburn Jr's words, “Fred Dallmayr is without doubt one of the leading theoretical phenomenologists of our time in the social sciences.” Phenomenology tries to relate the subject and the world of phenomena through an act of focused intention, and when combined with the resources of critical theory, it produces a critical phenomenology of politics. In it, phenomenology orients toward concrete human experience, while critical theory focuses on critiquing the effects of domination and exploitation in that experience.

According to Farah Godrej, “Dallmayr is widely acknowledged to be one of the primary forces behind the inauguration of this field of cross-cultural theory, also called ‘comparative political theory.’” Applying his intercultural perspective, he has written extensively on political thought in India, in the Far East, and in Muslim countries. His approach retains a connection with critical theory, involving thinkers such as Gandhi, Edward Said, Enrique Dussel, and Tzvetan Todorov.

=== Spirituality ===
Dallmayr analysed the philosophical-theological works of some twentieth-century philosophers and theologians, including Tillich, Thomas Merton, and Panikkar, highlighting the commonalities in their thought. All three insisted on the need for radical “metanoia,” meaning a “turn around or Kehre” or spiritual “conversion of heart.” They aimed for a holistic recovery from modern fragmentation, and sought to connect—in fruitful tension—the sacred with the secular, theology with philosophy, Christian teachings with the humanities, and the theoretical understanding with social praxis. Tillich, Merton, and Panikkar are exemplars of openness to intercultural and interreligious dialogue. Dallmayr examines their intensive interest in Zen Buddhism as distinct cases of the Christian-Buddhist encounter during the past half century: the intersection of Tillich's dialectical theology with Japanese Buddhist thought; the dialogue of Thomas Merton's trans-individualism with Zen Buddhism; and the encounter of Raimon Panikkar's Vedantic thoughts with the Buddhist “silence of God.”

Dallmayr paid special attention to the intercultural-interreligious and spiritual dimensions of Panikkar's works. His nondualistic views are congenial to those of Panikkar, who expresses nondualism in using the Indian notion of Advaita and who sees our age “as capable to moving beyond the ‘Western dilemma’ of monism/dualism or immanence/transcendence.” Dallmayr, being critical of both an agnostic immanentism lacking spirituality and a radical transcendentalism indifferent to social-ethical problems, sees in Panikkar’s holism a third possibility, pointing to the potential overcoming of the “transcendence-immanence” conundrum.

Dallmayr points out the connection between personal freedom and the caring for others. For human beings who are free from selfish egocentrism, it is natural to nurture the perfect virtue of compassion (karuna) and to be engaged in caring praxis. He writes, “The Buddha’s own praxis, anchored in his freedom, by no means seeks to advance his own status or influence; his karuna resides in ‘the superabundance of his state of ‘grace.’” What saves us is “the refusal to entertain any doctrine or ideology that pretends to deliver authoritative ‘knowledge’ of God.’” The Buddha’s teaching is directed to a “profound freedom” or total liberation from both external coercion and interior will to power, which, in turn, “paves the way toward a released humanity no longer entrapped in aggressive individual or collective identities.”

In reflecting on the meaning of spirituality, as it has been expressed in various religious traditions, Dallmayr mentions as the core feature of religion and spiritual experience “the transgression from self to other, from ‘immanence’ to (some kind of) ‘transcendence.’” Spirituality should “participate in this transgressive or transformative movement,” to be a vessel for “navigating the straits between immanence and transcendence, between the human and the divine.” Spirituality is commonly associated with a certain kind of responsiveness “inside” human beings, a kind of human “inwardness.” Religion cannot simply be an external form but has to find some kind of personal “resonance” among people today: “the heart (the heart-and-mind) might be described as the great ‘resonance chamber’ constantly open or attuned to new religious of mystical experiences.”

=== Democracy to come ===
Dallmayr was critical of the form of democracy currently found in the Western countries, which is characterized as liberal, laissez-faire, or minimalist, because the primary emphasis is on the liberty of individuals or groups to pursue their particular self-interests, while the role of “the people” as a government is minimalized and solely characterized by competitive elections with “slim procedural formalities serving as fig leaves to cover prevailing modes of domination.” He applied the ideas of dialogue to the conception of democratic politics as relational praxis, guided by ethical principles and “love of equality.” He challenges democracy that emphasizes the pursuit of individual or collective self-interest, insisting that more ethical conceptions are possible, that different societies should nurture democracy with their own cultural resources, and that a world has to promote “a fair relationality or qualitative equality between citizen, but also between West and non-West.”

He adopts Derrida's conceptualization of “democracy to come” and further develops his own version of it, which is characterized as relational, enabling potentiality, ethical, and apophatic. He views democracy as a “promise,” meaning that it is not presently an actuality, but it latently exists as a possibility or potentiality, the realization of which requires a process of striving, ethical cultivation, and self-transformation. Democracy is not a finished condition but an open-ended potentiality and creativity.

Dallmayr explores democratic traditions not only in the West, but also in India, China, and the Middle East. He discusses efforts to build democracy in regions. He examines the relation between democracy and Islam. He discusses Gandhian and Confucian perspectives on democracy as possible correctives to liberal and minimalist democracy. Gandhi's notions of self-governance (swaraj), nonviolence, and the struggle for justice allow for the practice of relational care and respect. Accordingly, Dallmayr presents a vision of democracy as popular self-rule in which civic education, ethical cultivation, and self-transformation make possible a nondomineering political agency.

=== Cosmopolis ===
Stephen Schneck, characterizing Dallmayr's views of the “civilizing process,” writes: “Not enmity, conflict, and the ‘clash’ cited by so many as the way to a new world arrangement; Dallmayr instead proposes ‘space’ for mutual world-disclosure through dialogue and discursive openness.” Dallmayr refers to cosmopolis as “an emerging global city or community.” He expresses dissatisfaction with some of the interpretations of cosmopolitanism: empirical, focused on economic and technological globalization, while hiding ethical deficits; and normative, which refer to international law and a legal world order, but which ignore local and regional contexts. He favors instead an approach that gives primacy to practice, “pointing to the need for concrete engagements across national, cultural, and religious boundaries” for “the building of a pluralistic and dialogical cosmopolis.”

He viewed cosmopolitanism not just in legal and institutional terms but in a broader cultural and philosophical sense. It presents an alternative to the status quo. He again finds useful insights in Heidegger's conception of temporality, meaning that human being-in-the-world is constantly “temporalized” in the direction of future possibilities. He also refers to John Dewey’s pragmatism, Alfred North Whitehead’s process philosophy, hermeneutics, and some other sources. Based on these, he developed his conception of “a ‘becoming cosmopolis’ beckoning from the future as a possibility and a promise.”

Dallmayr contributed to the development of a “new cosmopolitanism,” as reflexive, critical, democratic, rooted, dialogical, intercultural, and transformative. He developed his conception of cosmopolis in dialogue with the ideas of such theorists of cosmopolitanism as Karl-Otto Apel, Daniele Archibugi, Seyla Benhabib, Richard A. Falk, Raúl Fornet-Betancourt, Habermas, David Held, James Ingram, Martha Nussbaum, and Walter Mignolo, among others. At the same time, his conception of cosmopolis has some distinctive characteristics that are related to his interpretation of being-in-the-world, care, relationality, democratic politics as relational praxis, world maintenance, and spirituality.

== Selected bibliography ==
- Materialien zu Habermas' "Erkenntnis und Interesse". Frankfurt am Main: Suhrkamp, 1974 (edited collection of articles in German).
- Beyond Dogma and Despair: Toward a Critical Phenomenology of Politics'. Notre Dame, IN: University of Notre Dame Press, 1981. ISBN 9780268006617
- Twilight of Subjectivity: Contributions to a Post-Individualist Theory. Amherst, MA: University of Massachusetts Press,1981, 8ff. ISBN 9780870233142
- Language and Politics: Why Does Language Matter to Political Philosophy? . Notre Dame, IN: University of Notre Dame Press, 1984. ISBN 0268012709
- Polis and Praxis: Exercises in Contemporary Political Theory. Cambridge, MA: MIT Press, 1984. ISBN 0262040786
- Critical Encounters: Between Philosophy and Politics. Notre Dame, IN: University of Notre Dame Press, 1987. ISBN 0268007608
- Margins of Political Discourse. Albany: State University of New York Press, 1989. ISBN 0791400352
- The Communicative Ethics Controversy (with Seyla Benhabib). Cambridge, MA: MIT Press, 1990. ISBN 9780262023054
- Between Freiburg and Frankfurt: Toward a Critical Ontology. Amherst, University of Massachusetts Press, 1991. e-book. ISBN 9780585178783
- Life-World, Modernity and Critique: Paths between Heidegger and the Frankfurt School. Polity Press/Blackwell, 1991. ISBN 9780745608198
- G. W. F. Hegel: Modernity and Politics. Lanham, MD: Rowman and Littlefield, 1993. ISBN 0742521362
- The Other Heidegger, Ithaca, NY: Cornell University Press, 1993. ISBN 9780801429095
- Beyond Orientalism: Essays on Cross-Cultural Encounter. Albany: State University of New York Press, 1996. 0791430693
- Alternative Visions: Path in the Global Village. Lanham, MD: Rowman and Littlefield, 1998. ISBN 0847687678
- Achieving Our World: Toward a Global and Plural Democracy. Lanham, MD: Rowman and Littlefield, 2001. ISBN 0742511847.
- Dialogue among Civilizations: Some Exemplary Voices. New York: Palgrave Macmillan, 2002. ISBN 9781403960603
- Peace Talks—Who Will Listen? Notre Dame, IN: University of Notre Dame Press, 2004. ISBN 9780268025687
- Small Wonder: Global Power and Its Discontents. Lanham, MD: Lexington Books, 2005. ISBN 9780742549678
- In Search of the Good Life: A Pedagogy for Troubled Times. Lexington: University of Kentucky Press, 2007. e-book. ISBN 9780813172682
- Integral Pluralism: Beyond Culture Wars. Lexington: University of Kentucky Press, 2010. ISBN 9780813125718
- The Promise of Democracy: Political Agency and Transformation. Albany: State University of New York Press, 2010. ISBN 9781438430393
- Return to Nature? An Ecological Counter-History. Lexington: University of Kentucky Press, 2011. ISBN 9780813134338
- Being in the World: Dialogue and Cosmopolis. Lexington: University Press of Kentucky, 2013. ISBN 9780813141916
- Mindfulness and Letting Be: On Engaged Thinking and Acting. London: Lexington Books, 2014. ISBN 9780739199862
- Freedom and Solidarity: Toward New Beginnings. Lexington: University of Kentucky Press, 2015. ISBN 9780813165783
- Against Apocalypse: Recovering Humanity’s Wholeness. Lexington Books, 2017. ISBN 9781498524469
- Democracy to Come: Democracy as Relational Praxis. Oxford University Press, 2017. e-book. ISBN 9780190670986
- Fred Dallmayr: Critical Phenomenology, Cross-Cultural Theory, Cosmopolitanism. Edited by Farah Godrej. New York: Routledge, 2017. ISBN 9781138955936
- On the Boundary: A Life Remembered. Lanham, MD: Hamilton Books, 2017, 10. ISBN 9780761869566
- Spiritual Guides: Pathfinders in the Desert. Notre Dame, IN: University of Notre Dame Press, 2017. e-book. ISBN 9780268102593
