= FQP =

FQP may refer to:

- Fédération québécoise de picklebal, Quebec Pickleball Federation
- Filosofia e Questioni Pubbliche, a philosophy journal founded by Sebastiano Maffettone
- Freight quality partnerships
- FutureQuake Press, a British comic publisher
