= Alessandro Ferrara =

Italian philosopher (born 1953)

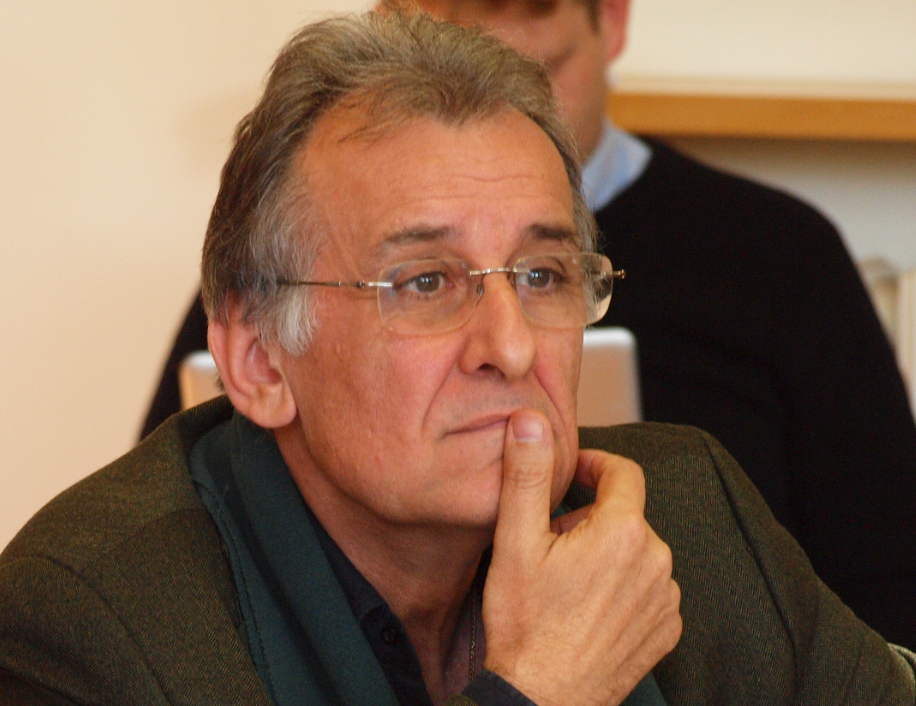
- Alessandro Ferrara
- Born: 1953 (age 72–73); Trieste, Italy
- Occupation: philosopher

Alessandro Ferrara (born 1953 in Trieste) is an Italian philosopher, professor emeritus of political philosophy at the University of Rome Tor Vergata and former president of the Italian Association for Political Philosophy. He is an adjunct professor of legal theory at Luiss University in Rome and won the Best 2023 Book prize, awarded by ICON-S, the International Society of Public Law, for his book Sovereignty Across Generations. Constituent Power and Political Liberalism.

== Studies ==
Ferrara graduated in philosophy in Italy (1975) and later, as a Harkness Fellow, received his Ph.D. from the University of California, Berkeley (1984). He carried out post-doctoral research in Munich and Frankfurt with Jürgen Habermas as a Von Humboldt Fellow and then at Berkeley again (1989), leading to the publication of his first book, Modernity and Authenticity.

== Academic life ==
Ferrara was an assistant professor in sociology at the University of Rome La Sapienza between 1984 and 1998, then an associate professor in sociology at the University of Parma between 1998 and 2002. Between 2002 and 2023, Ferrara was professor of political philosophy and is now a professor emeritus at the University of Rome Tor Vergata.

Since 1991, Ferrara has been a co-director of the yearly conference Philosophy and Social Science, initially held at the Interuniversity Centre of Dubrovnik, but since 1993 relocated to Prague, under the auspices of the Czech Academy of Sciences.

In 1990, he co-founded the Seminario di Teoria Critica (Italy), and up to 2019, he was a co-director. He is on the advisory board of the Association Reset – Dialogues of Civilizations.

Ferrara is co-editor, with David M. Rasmussen, of the series Philosophy and Politics – Critical Explorations (Springer), and editorial consultant for a number of journals including Constellations, Philosophy & Social Criticism, Philosophy & Public Issues, Krisis, Balsa de la Medusa, Studies in Social & Political Thought, Berlin Journal of Critical Theory, and Symposion: Theoretical and Applied Inquiries in Philosophy and Social Sciences.

He has taught and lectured at universities and institutions including Boston College, Harvard University, Columbia University, Rice University, Cardozo Law School, Yale University, New School for Social Research, University College London (UCL), Oxford University, the Chinese Academy of Social Science in Beijing, Sapienza University of Rome, the Hebrew University of Jerusalem, Bilgi University and Sehir University in Istanbul, the National University of Singapore, Monash University in Johannesburg and in Melbourne, and the Universities of California (at Berkeley), Paris – Sorbonne, Madrid, Chicago, Potsdam, Amsterdam, Mexico City, Exeter, Manchester, Rio de Janeiro, London, Exeter, Dublin, Belfast, Coimbra, Lisbon, Frankfurt, Copenhagen, Berne, Bordeaux, Barcelona, Kraków, Lyon III, Tilburg, Luxembourg, Mumbai, Indore, Porto Alegre, Campo Grande, Catholic University of Chile in Santiago, Leuven, Hamburg, Sydney.

== Research ==
Ferrara's work revolves around an account of normativity centered on authenticity and exemplarity, which rests on a reconstructed version of Kant's "reflective judgment" and is intended as an alternative both to neo-transcendental approaches to validity (Habermas, Apel) and to anti-normative, radical contextualism (Rorty, Lyotard, Derrida).

In Reflective Authenticity (1998), exemplary normativity is first outlined, and in Justice and Judgment (1999) is developed in the direction of a political-philosophical notion of justice based on reflective judgment. In The Force of the Example (2008), drawing on Kant's Critique of the Power of Judgment but also on Arendt, Rawls, Dworkin, and Habermas, Ferrara applies his view of exemplary validity to central themes of contemporary political philosophy, including public reason, human rights, radical evil, sovereignty, republicanism and liberalism, as well as religion in the public sphere.

In The Democratic Horizon. Hyperpluralism and the Renewal of Political Liberalism (2014), Ferrara argues that Rawls's "political liberalism" needs to be updated in order to improve its traction in a historical context different from the original one. Four adjustments – conjectural arguments, an enriched notion of the democratic ethos, a decentering of it in several local varieties, as well as the remedial model of a multivariate democratic polity – are suggested in order to enable political liberalism to meet the challenge of hyperpluralism. The sources of normativity investigated in Ferrara's earlier work — exemplarity, judgment, the normativity of identity — are added to the conceptual resources of a revisited political liberalism.

Legitimation by Constitution. A Dialogue on Political Liberalism (2021), co-authored with Frank Michelman, addresses the implications of Rawls’s "liberal principle of legitimacy" in three areas: the tension between government by the people and government by consent; the ensuing challenges for judicial treatments of constitutional law; and the magnification of these tensions and challenges when transnational legal ordering comes under consideration.

Sovereignty Across Generations. Constituent Power and Political Liberalism (2023) carries forth Ferrara's rethinking of political liberalism in the light of exemplary normativity. Rawls's view of constituent power is reconstructed as bound by the standard of "the most reasonable for us" and as cutting across Kelsen's and Schmitt's paradigms. Rawls's theory of the implicit limits to "amending power" is reformulated on the basis of the notion of “vertical reciprocity”. A newly introduced “political conception of the people” accounts for the self-constitution of “the people”, and – in response to the challenges raised by populism – the distinction is explored of how representing the transgenerational people differs from representing its living segment, the electorate.

== Books ==
- Sovereignty Across Generations. Constituent Power and Political Liberalism, Oxford, Oxford University Press, 2023] [awarded “Best 2023 Book” prize by ICON-S, International Society of Public Law] (transl. into Italian)
  - Symposia on the book:
    1. "Making Constituent Power Safe for Democracy: Special Section on Alessandro Ferrara's Sovereignty Across Generations: Constituent Power and Political Liberalism", in Philosophy & Social Criticism, 2024/50, pp. 1417-1519, (articles by A. Azmanova, F. Michelman, D. Rasmussen, J. van der Walt, S. Winter, P. Niesen, B. Schupmann, reply by A. Ferrara);
    2. "Sovereignty Across Generations: Constituent Power and Political Liberalism, by Alessandro Ferrara", in Jerusalem Review of Legal Studies, 2024/30/1, pp. 1-43, (articles by I. Porat, A. Sharon, R. Gargarella, reply by A. Ferrara);
    3. "Symposium: Alessandro Ferrara, Sovereignty Across Generations: Constituent Power and Political Liberalism", in Etica & Politica/Ethics & Politics, 2024/3, pp. 103-186, (articles by H. Lindahl, S. Maffettone, A. Pirni, I. Salvatore, reply by A. Ferrara);
    4. "Who is the People? Alessandro Ferrara's Sovereignty Across Generations", in Biblioteca della libertà, LIX, n. 239, 2024, pp. 5-154, (articles by G. Favara, R. Sala, M. Croce, M. Santambrogio, A.E. Galeotti, F.G. Pizzetti, F. Pasquali, reply by A. Ferrara);
    5. "Symposium on Alessandro Ferrara’s Sovereignty Across Generations. Constituent Power and Political Liberalism", in Filosofia e Questioni Pubbliche/Philosophy and Public Issues, n. 1/2025, pp. 3-76 (articles by G. Favara and R. Sala, T. Andina, M. Iser, G. Pellegrino, reply by A. Ferrara);
    6. "Sovereignty Across Generations", in Rivista Internazionale di Filosofia del Diritto, n. 1/2025, pp. 1-120 (articles by V. Gentile, G. Piccirilli, G. Preterossi, F.E. Brozzetti, reply by A. Ferrara);
    7. "Symposium on Alessandro Ferrara’s Sovereignty Across Generations", in Ethics, Politics & Society, n. 2/2025, pp. 164-218 (articles by A. Lever, A. Gosseries, D. Santoro, G. Ballacci, reply by A. Ferrara);
    8. “Book Symposium: Alessandro Ferrara, Sovereignty Across Generations: Constituent Power and Political Liberalism” (articles by R. Aberyratne, W. Sadurski, A. Wijayalath, A. Doyle, reply by A. Ferrara);
- Legitimation by Constitution: A Dialogue on Political Liberalism, Oxford, Oxford University Press (Series: Constitutional Theory), 2021]
- Rousseau and Critical Theory, Boston-Leiden, Brill, 2017]
- The Democratic Horizon. Hyperpluralism and the Renewal of Political Liberalism, New York, Cambridge University Press, 2014] (transl. into Italian, Spanish and Portuguese)
  - Symposia on the book:
    1. "Liberalism between Politics and Epistemology: A Discussion of Alessandro Ferrara’s The Democratic Horizon: Hyperpluralism and the Renewal of Political Liberalism", in Political Studies, 2016, pp. 1-23, (articles by M. Ivkovic, J. Loncar, S. Prodanovic, B. Simeunovic, reply by A. Ferrara);
    2. "Democracy in the Age of Hyperpluralism. Special Section on Alessandro Ferrara’s The Democratic Horizon: Hyperpluralism and the renewal of political liberalism", in Philosophy & Social Criticism, 2016, Vol. 42 (7), pp. 635–706 (articles by D. Rasmussen, F. Michelman, S. Benhabib, S.K. White, W. Scheuerman, A.S. Laden, reply by A. Ferrara);
    3. "The Prospect for Liberal-Democracy in Troubled Times. A Symposium on Alessandro Ferrara’s The Democratic Horizon", the supplementary volume of Jura Gentium. Journal of Philosophy of International Law and Global Politics (2017), Vol. XIV, n. 1, edited by L. Marchettoni, pp. 1-132 (articles by D. Owen, M. Festenstein, L. Baccelli, D.A. García, M. Solinas, L. Marchettoni, I. Testa, reply by A. Ferrara);
    4. "Le sfide della democrazia e il liberalismo politico", Comments on A.Ferrara, The Democratic Horizon, in Notizie di Politeia, XXXIII, 126, 2017, pp. 165-183 (articles by E. Biale, V. Ottonelli, M. Santambrogio, reply by A. Ferrara).
- The Force of the Example. Explorations in the Paradigm of Judgment, New York, Columbia University Press, 2008] (transl. into Italian and Spanish)
  - Symposia on the book:
    1. "Review Symposium on The Force of the Example" in Political Studies, 2009, pp. 1-16 (articles by D. Castiglione, J. Richardson, A. Schaap, C. Wagner, reply by A. Ferrara).
    2. "Validità esemplare, estetica e politica. Discutendo La forza dell'esempio di A.Ferrara" numero monografico di Jura Gentium. Journal of Philosophy of International Law and Global Politics, edited by L. Marchettoni, articles by L. Baccelli, C. Bottici, L. Cortella, F. Crespi, E. Galeotti, T. Griffero, L. Marchettoni, M. Rosati, D. Santoro, reply by A. Ferrara)
- Justice and Judgment. The Rise and the Prospect of the Judgment Model in Contemporary Political Philosophy, London, Sage, 1999] (transl. into Italian)
- Reflective Authenticity. Rethinking the Project of Modernity, London and New York, Routledge, 1998] (transl. into Italian and Spanish)
  - Symposium on the book:
    1. "Symposium on Reflective Authenticity" in Philosophy & Social Criticism, 2004, 30, 1, pp. 5-24 (articles by Ch. Larmore, A. Honneth, reply by A. Ferrara).
- Modernity and Authenticity. A Study of the Social and Ethical Thought of Jean-Jacques Rousseau, Albany, NY: SUNY Press, 1993] (transl. into Italian)

== Edited volumes ==
- with D. Rasmussen e V. Kaul, Between State and Civil Society: Who Protects Individual Liberties and Human Dignity, special issue of Philosophy & Social Criticism, 2023, Vol. 49, 5.
- A. Ferrara (ed.), Prague: 25 Years of Critical Theory, special issue of Philosophy & Social Criticism, 2017, Vol. 43, 3, pp. 235–372.

== Recent articles ==
- “Constitutional Identity and Constitutional Authenticity”, ICON, 2026 (2), 1-15, open access.
- “If Foucault, why not Rawls? On enlarging the critical tent”, Constellations, 2023, Vol. 30 (4), 401–405.
- “What the controversy over ‘the reasonable’ reveals: On Habermas’s Auch eine Geschichte der Philosophie”, Philosophy & Social Criticism, 2022, Vol. 48(3) 313–332.
