= Italian Association for Political Philosophy =

The Società Italiana di Filosofia Politica (English: Italian Association for Political Philosophy) is an association of academic and non-academic practitioners of political philosophy in Italy. The association's aim is to further the study of political philosophy in its various orientations and to promote dialogue among Italian and other intellectual communities of scholars interested in the current debate in political philosophy.

The association was founded in 2001 by a number of philosophers, including Giuliano Marini, Giulio M. Chiodi, Sebastiano Maffettone, Giacomo Marramao, Giovanni Fiaschi, Raimondo Cubeddu, Salvatore Veca, Michelangelo Bovero, Alessandro Ferrara, Roberto Gatti—some of whom had significant contact with the Italian political philosopher Norberto Bobbio.

The first president of the association (after a temporary provisional steering committee led by Giuliano Marini) was Sebastiano Maffettone (2002–04). Roberto Gatti served as president from 2004 to 2005. From 2005 to 2010, for two terms, the president was Alessandro Ferrara, and from 2010 to 2013 Laura Bazzicalupo. The current president of the association is Stefano Petrucciani.
