= David Rasmussen =

David Rasmussen may refer to:

- David Rasmussen (footballer) (born 1976), Danish footballer
- David M. Rasmussen, American philosopher
- David Tab Rasmussen (1958–2014), American biological anthropologist
