= Paolo Benanti =

Italian priest and theologian

The Reverend Paolo Benanti TOR
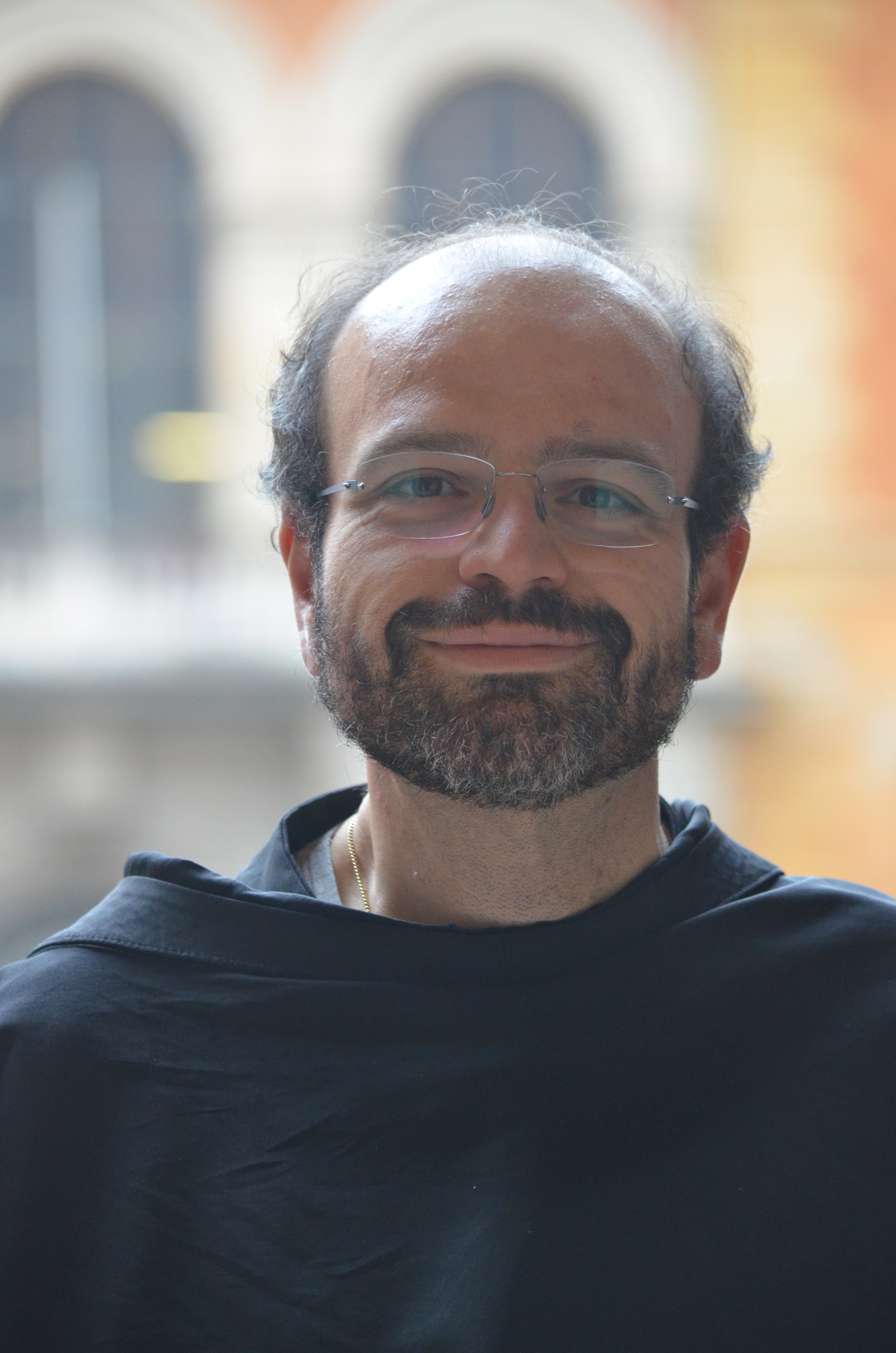
- Benanti in 2016
- Born: 20 July 1973 (age 53); Rome, Italy
- Occupation: theologian
- Known for: AI advisor to Pope Leo; Former advisor to Pope Francis

Paolo Benanti, TOR (born 20 July 1973) is an Italian Catholic priest, theologian and academic. He is a member of the Third Order Regular of St. Francis. He teaches at the Pontifical Gregorian University and is advisor to Pope Leo on issues of artificial intelligence and technology ethics. He was also advisor to Pope Francis on these issues.

== Biography ==
Born in Rome on 20 July 1973, the son of engineer Angelo Benanti and teacher Andreina Albani. In 1986, his family moved to Frascati, a comune in Lazio.

After having matured his vocation, in 1999, he left the university and entered the Third Regular Order of Saint Francis, in the convent of Massa Martana, where he spent his probationary year and novitiate. On 16 September 2001, he received the Franciscan habit. He was ordained a priest on 23 May 2009. He served as the first councilor general and prosecutor general of the Order for the six-year period 2013–2019. In his baccalaureate studies in theology at the Theological Institute of Assisi (2001–2006), he had as a teacher the moralist Giovanni Cappelli.

At the Pontifical Gregorian University, he obtained his licentiate in 2008 and his doctorate in moral theology in 2012. His doctoral thesis is entitled The Cyborg. Corpo e corporeità nell'epoca del postumano, (The Cyborg: Body and Corporeality in the Post-Human Era) and won the Bellarmino-Vedovato Award as the best doctoral thesis in public and social ethics in 2012.

In 2013 and 2014, he attended The Intensive Bioethics Course at the Joseph P. and Rose F. Kennedy Institute of Ethics of Georgetown University.

Since 2008, he works as a professor at the Pontifical Gregorian University, the Theological Institute of Assisi, and at the Pontifical College Leoni d'Anagni. In addition to institutional courses on sexual morality and bioethics, he deals with neuroethics, technology ethics, artificial intelligence, and post-human intelligence. Since 2015, he has tried to apply and develop an ethical framework for artificial intelligence by developing the concepts of algorithm and algocracy. Since 2020, in collaboration with Sebastiano Maffettone, a political philosopher, he has explored the vital, relational, social and communicative, labor and economic dimensions, seen as the results of the interaction, with complex ethical implications, between the resources offered by the virtual and interactive reality and social and individual existence. This path leads him to the recognition of the creation of a hybrid reality, between utopia and dystopia, which takes the name of paraferno. These concepts are studied in depth through a series of editorials jointly signed between the two authors published in the Italian newspaper Corriere della Sera.

In 2018, Vincenzo Paglia named him a corresponding member of the Pontifical Academy for Life with a particular mandate for the world of artificial intelligence.

In February 2019, he was appointed Provincial Minister of the Religious Province of Saint Francis of Assisi of the Third Regular Order of Saint Francis after an assembly convened in Assisi, Italy.

On 4 November 2019, Pope Francis appointed him Councilor of the Apostolic Penitentiary (the oldest dicastery of the Roman Curia and the first of its tribunals). On 11 November 2019, the Pontiff appointed him Consultant of the Pontifical Council for Culture, whose regent was Cardinal Gianfranco Ravasi, and which aims to "foster relations between the Holy See and the world of culture, especially promoting dialogue with different cultures" of our time, so that "the civilization of man is more and more open to the Gospel, and that lovers of science, literature and the arts feel recognized by the Church as people at the service of the true, of the good and beautiful".

On 12 February 2021, he was appointed by Pope Francis as an ordinary member of the Pontifical Academy for Life.

== Works ==
- Vivere il morire. Spunti per l'antropologia biomedica, Cittadella, 2009.
- The Cyborg: corpo e corporeità nell'epoca del postumano, Cittadella, 2012.
- Amerai!, Cittadella, 2014.
- Massimo Reichlin and Paolo Benanti, Il doping della mente. Le sfide del potenziamento cognitivo farmacologico, Messaggero, 2014.
- Ti esti? Prima lezione di bioetica, Cittadella, 2016.
- La condizione tecno-umana. Domande di senso nell'era della tecnologia, EDB, 2016.
- Postumano, troppo postumano. Neurotecnologie e human enhancement, Castelvecchi, 2017.
- L'hamburger di Frankenstein. La rivoluzione della carne sintetica, EDB, 2017.
- Homo Faber. The Techno-Human condition, EDB, 2018.
- Realtà sintetica. Dall'aspirina alla vita: come ricreare il mondo?, Castelvecchi, 2018.
- Le macchine sapienti, Marietti, 2018.
- Oracoli. Tra algoretica e algocrazia, Luca Sossela Editore, 2018.
- Vedere l'alba dentro l'imbrunire. Scenari plausibili dopo il COVID-19, Castelvecchi, 2020
- Ricordare troppo. Eccessi di memoria da Borges alle neuroscienze, Marietti, 2020
- Digital Age. Teoria del cambio d'epoca. Persona, famiglia e società, San Paolo, 2020
- Oráculos: entre ética e governança dos algoritmos, Editora Unisinos, 2020
- Se l'uomo non basta. Speranze e timori nell'uso della tecnologia contro il Covid-19, Castelvecchi, 2020.
- La grande invenzione. Il linguaggio come tecnologia, dalle pitture rupestri al GPT-3, San Paolo, Cinisello Balsamo, 2021
- Human in the loop. Decisioni umane e intelligenze artificiali, Mondadori Università, Milano, 2022
