= Cultural exchange =

Cultural exchange may refer to:

- Cultural diplomacy, the intentional use of culture in the interests of a nation
- Cultural globalization, the interchange of aspects of culture between nations, for any reason such as migration, trade, and travel

== See also ==
- Student exchange program
