= Stephen F. Schneck =

American Catholic activist (born 1953)

Stephen Schneck
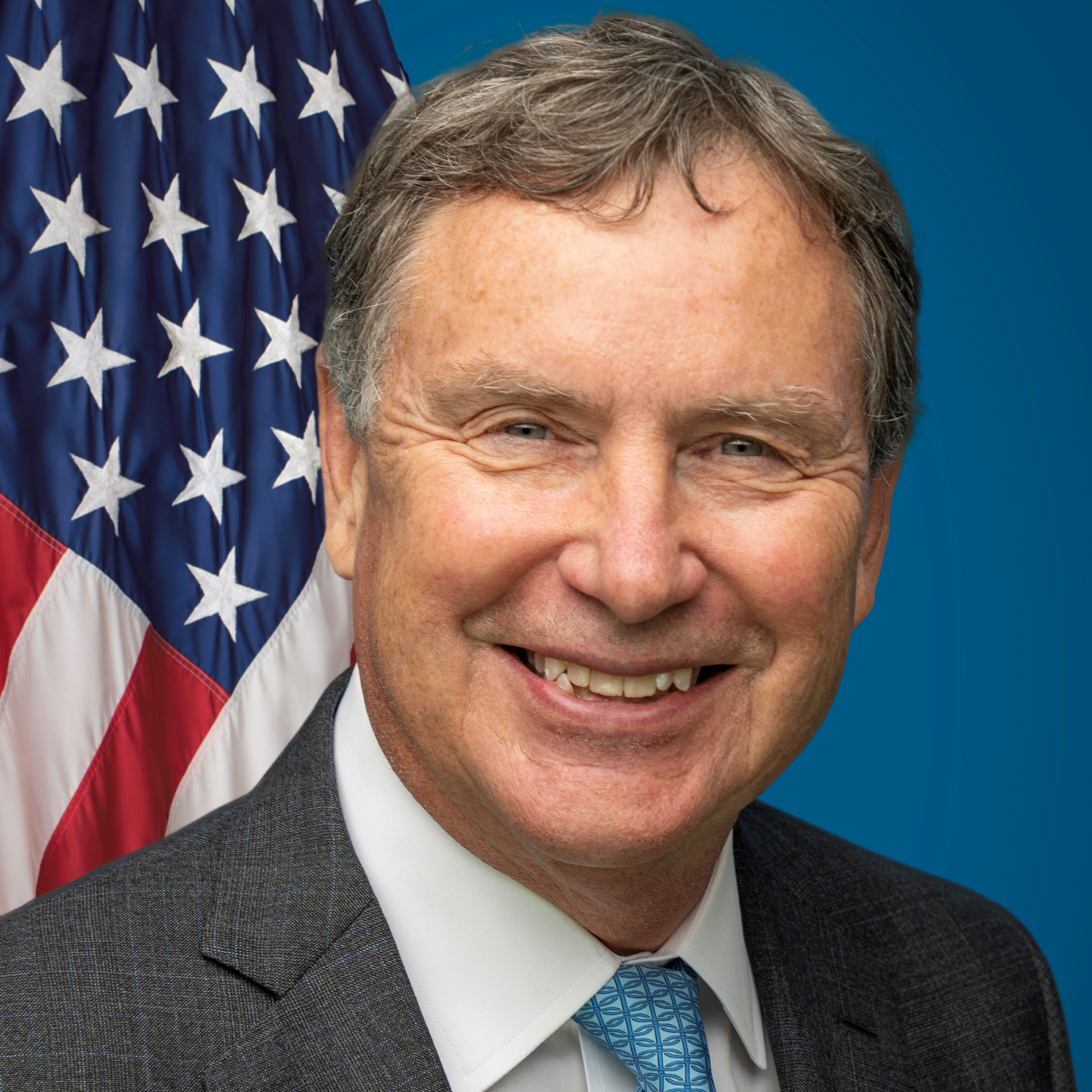

Chair of the U.S. Commission on International Religious Freedom
- In office June 3, 2024 – June 9, 2025
- Preceded by: Abraham Cooper
- Succeeded by: Vicky Hartzler

Personal details
- Education: Rockhurst University (BA); University of Notre Dame (Master's degree), (Doctorate)

Stephen Frederick Schneck (born 1953) is an American Catholic activist. He served as the Chair of the U.S. Commission on International Religious Freedom from 2024-2025.

== Education ==
Schneck attended Rockhurst University, where he received a B.A. in Political Science and Philosophy in 1976. He earned his master's degree and doctoral degrees from the University of Notre Dame in 1981 and 1984, respectively.

== Career ==
Formerly an associate professor at The Catholic University of America (CUA), where he was also the Director of CUA's Institute for Policy Research and Catholic Studies, he retired from the university in 2018. A public speaker and lecturer, Schneck is a frequent source of media analysis on issues involving Catholicism and public policy. He was chair of the Department of Politics from 1995 to 2007 and Acting Undergraduate Dean of the School of Arts & Sciences in 1988. From 2012 to 2013, he was appointed as the Acting Dean of the National Catholic School of Social Service at Catholic University.

Schneck's academic work has focused on political philosophy, with special emphases on 18th- century American political thought and contemporary continental political theory. More recently he has focused on the role of religion in democracy. He is the author of several books and articles in the field of political philosophy; notable publications include two books on the political theory of Max Scheler, an edited volume on the work of Fred Dallmayr, and articles and book chapters examining such figures as Tocqueville, Michel Foucault, and Jürgen Habermas, among others.

=== Public service ===
He serves on the board of directors for Catholic Mobilizing Network and for Catholic Climate Covenant. He was previously a board member for Sojourners, for Catholics in Alliance for the Common Good, and for Democrats for Life of America. He served as national co-chair of Catholics for Biden in 2020. He served as a national co-chair of Catholics for Obama in 2012. In 2015, Schneck was appointed to President Barack Obama's third Advisory Council on for the White House Office of Faith-Based and Neighborhood Partnerships.

On June 15, 2022, the White House announced Schneck's appointment to the United States Commission on International Religious Freedom. On June 3, 2024, Schneck was unanimously elected to Chair the United States Commission on International Religious Freedom. His term expired in 2026.

== Selected works ==
=== Books ===
- Letting Be: Fred Dallmayr’s Cosmopolitical Vision. Editor. (Notre Dame, Ind.: University of Notre Dame Press, 2006)
- Max Scheler's Acting Persons: New Perspectives. Editor. (Amsterdam: Rodopi Press, 2002)
- Italy in Transition: The Long Road from the First to the Second Republic. Co-Edited (with Ambassador Paolo Janni) with Introduction. (Washington, D. C.: Council for Research in Values and Philosophy, 1998)
- Person & Polis: Max Scheler's Personalism as Political Theory. (Albany, NY: SUNY Press, 1988)

=== Journal articles ===
- "The End of History and the Human Sciences", International Journal of Philosophy (Summer 1997)
- "New Readings of Tocqueville's America", Polity (Fall 1993)
- "Habits of the Head: Tocqueville's America", Political Theory (Fall 1990)
- "William Connolly's Post-Modern Liberalism", The Review of Politics (Spring 1989)
- "Michel Foucault on power/discourse, theory and practice", Human Studies (Summer 1987)
