= Techno-nationalism =

Way of understanding how technology affects the society and culture of a nation

Techno-nationalism is a way of understanding how technology affects the society and culture of a nation. One common example is the use of technology to advance nationalist agendas, with the goal of promoting connectedness and a stronger national identity. As noted by Alex Capri, the rise of techno-nationalist approaches has precipitated a US-China race to promote ideological values through the reshaping of institutions and standards. This idea establishes the belief that the success of a nation can be determined by how well that nation innovates and diffuses technology across its people. Technological nationalists believe that the presence of national R&D efforts, and the effectiveness of these efforts, are key drivers to the overall growth, sustainability, and prosperity of a nation. Techno-nationalism is an increasingly dominant approach in governance that links a nation’s technological capabilities and self-sufficiency to its state security, economic prosperity, and social stability. It is a response to a new era of global systemic competition between differing ideologies of economic development.

== Leaders of innovation ==
Technological nationalism is consistently tied to specific countries that are known for their innovative nature. These countries such as Great Britain, Germany and the United States have become known for being leaders in technological growth. When identifying leaders in technological innovation it has been affirmed "technologies are associated with particular nations. Cotton textiles and steam power are seen as British, chemicals as German, mass production as American, consumer electronics as Japanese." These countries have grown to be prosperous due to their strong economic ties to technological growth, "Historians and others have assumed that Germany and America grew fast in the early years of the twentieth century because of rapid national innovation." Because of the effect that technology has on economic growth there is an implicit tie between economic growth and nationalism. Britain became an example of this tie between economic prosperity and technological innovation when they invested heavily in technological research and development to match the innovation standards of other countries.

Today, techno-nationalism is seen to manifest in geopolitical rivalry, particularly between the United States and China. The increasing geopolitical tensions and bifurcation in technology between the United States and China have resulted in the signing of the CHIPS for America Act to support domestic technological innovation in the US, and the Made In China 2025 plan, to secure China’s position as a global powerhouse in high-tech industries. The competing nature of the two responses seeks to reassert nationalistic sentiments in a nation’s technological progress and development, and its implications are felt strongest in geopolitics and trade.

== China ==
Over the past decade, China has launched various programs, including Made in China 2025 and China Standards 2035 to reduce its dependency on foreign technologies. At the 2020 National People's Congress, the Chinese Communist Party announced its renewed commitment to their two leading industrial initiatives, in addition to investing US$1.4 trillion on a digital infrastructure public spending scheme. Government policy is directly aimed at increasing local content in high tech manufacturing, and it promotes and funds research and development. The regulatory environment favours local companies, and its domestic market of over 800-million internet users is an advantage. Into the 2020s, China was the largest importer of semiconductors; state-backed industrial projects, investing billions of US dollars in domestic technology capacity, are underway with the aim of reaching semiconductor self-sufficiency.

== Indonesia ==
Indonesia is not often thought of as an area where excessive innovation occurs. However, in relation to technological nationalism, Indonesia is a front-runner. In 1976, Indonesia established the Industri Pesawat Terban Nusantara or IPTN, which is a government issued company that specializes in air and space travel. The IPTN would soon receive a 2 billion dollar investment from the government, making it among the largest companies in a third world country, let alone one of the only aircraft manufacturers. Because of its overwhelming success, Indonesians felt immense pride for their country and became "a prominent symbol of Indonesian national esteem and pride." Because of this newfound confidence, Indonesians began to consider themselves "equal to Westerners," showing that having pride in one's country can be a direct result of technological investments.

== Canada ==
Canada's greatest challenge in the 19th century was to unite the country across a continent. The construction of the CPR (from 1881 to 1885) was a deliberate political and economic attempt to unite Canada's regions and link Eastern and Western Canada, the heartland and hinterland respectively. Charland identified this project as based on the nation's faith in technology's ability to overcome physical obstacles. As the technology was adapted to suit Canadian needs, it fed the national rhetoric that railroads were an integral part of nation building. This spirit of technological nationalism also fuelled the development of broadcasting in the country and thus further served in the development of a national identity. Paradoxically however, these technologies, which historian Harold Innis termed "space-binding," simultaneously supported and undermined the development of a Canadian nation. Based in connection rather than content, they did not favour any particular set of values, except those arising from trade and communication themselves, and so they also contributed to Canada's integration into first the British empire, and then the American culture.

== Techno-nationalism and country of origin ==
Techno-nationalism is a perspective that emphasizes domestic control over technology and the digital economy to advance national security and economic prosperity, encouraging policies that reduce reliance on foreign technologies and build national innovation capacity.

The concept of Country of origin (COO) plays a critical role in this context, as it can shape a nation’s economic independence and technological competitiveness. By identifying and managing the COO of technological products and services, a nation may reduce dependence on external suppliers, foster domestic innovation, and strengthen resilience against potential foreign cyber threats.

A recent study introduces a framework for assessing the COO of digital products, incorporating 19 parameters that reflect the complexities of hardware, software, and data sources. Establishing such a measure for determining the extent to which the components of technological products are produced domestically is essential for evaluating these products from a techno-nationalism perspective.

== See also ==
- Communication theory
- Country of origin
- Identitarian movement
- Nation-building
- Nationalism
- Political communications
- Political rhetoric
- Techno-globalism
- Scientific nationalism
- Reactionary modernism
