= Political globalization =

Growth of the worldwide political system

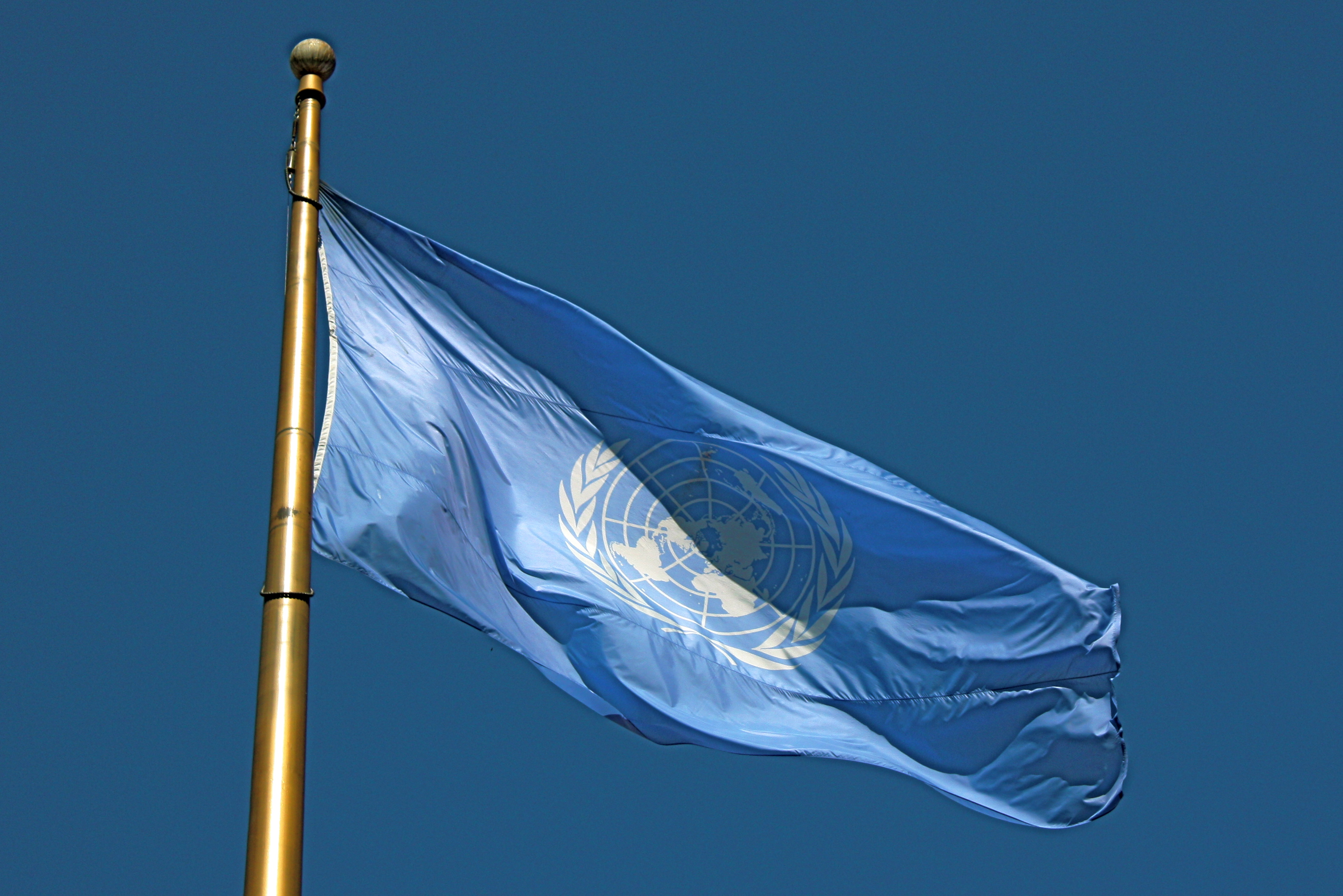
The Flag of the United Nations at United Nations Plaza. The UN is one of the key organizations in the process of the political globalization.

Political globalization is the growth of the worldwide political system, both in size and complexity. That system includes national governments, their governmental and intergovernmental organizations as well as government-independent elements of global civil society such as international non-governmental organizations and social movement organizations. One of the key aspects of political globalization is the declining importance of the nation-state and the rise of other actors on the political scene. The creation and existence of the United Nations is called one of the classic examples of political globalization.

Political globalization is one of the three main dimensions of globalization commonly found in academic literature, with the two other being economic globalization and cultural globalization.

== Definitions ==
William R. Thompson has defined it as "the expansion of a global political system, and its institutions, in which inter-regional transactions (including, but certainly not limited to trade) are managed". Valentine M. Moghadam defined it as "an increasing trend toward multilateralism (in which the United Nations plays a key role), to an emerging 'transnational state apparatus,' and toward the emergence of national and international nongovernmental organizations that act as watchdogs over governments and have increased their activities and influence". Manfred B. Steger in turn wrote that it "refers to the intensification and expansion of political interrelations across the globe". The longer definition by Colin Crouch goes as follows: "Political globalization refers to the growing power of institutions of global governance such as the World Bank, the International Monetary Fund (IMF) and the World Trade Organization (WTO). But it also refers to the spread and influence of international non-governmental organizations, social movement organizations and transnational advocacy networks operating across borders and constituting a kind of global civil society." Finally, Gerard Delanty and Chris Rumford define it as "a tension between three processes which interact to produce the complex field of global politics: global geopolitics, global normative culture and polycentric networks." The book World Federalist Manifesto, Guide to Political Globalization defines political globalization as "the creation of a system of global governance that regulates relationships among nations and guarantees the rights arising from social and economic globalization."

== Methodology ==
Salvatore Babones discussing sources used by scholars for studying political globalization noted the usefulness of Europa World Year Book for data on diplomatic relationships between countries, publications of International Institute for Strategic Studies such as The Military Balance for matters of military, and US government publication Patterns of Global Terrorism for matters of terrorism.

Political globalization is measured by aggregating and weighting data on the number of embassies and high commissioners in a country, the number of the country's membership in international organizations, its participation in the UN peacekeeping missions, and the number of international treaties signed by said country. This measure has been used by Axel Dreher, Noel Gaston, Pim Martens, and Jeffrey Haynes, and is available from the KOF institute at ETH Zurich.

== Aspects ==
Like globalization itself, political globalization has several dimensions and lends itself to a number of interpretations. It has been discussed in the context of new emancipatory possibilities, as well as in the context of loss of autonomy and fragmentation of the social world. Political globalization can be seen in changes such as democratization of the world, creation of the global civil society, and moving beyond the centrality of the nation-state, particularly as the sole actor in the field of politics. Some of the questions central to the discussion of the political globalization are related to the future of the nation-state, whether its importance is diminishing and what are the causes for those changes; and understanding the emergence of the concept of global governance. The creation and existence of the United Nations has been called one of the classic examples of political globalization. Political actions by non-governmental organizations and social movements, concerned about various topics such as environmental protection, is another example.

David Held has proposed that continuing political globalization may lead to the creation of a world government-like cosmopolitan democracy, though this vision has also been criticized as too idealistic.

== Political Globalization and Nation State ==
There is a heated debate over the dynamics and interaction between political globalization and nation- states. The question arises whether or not political globalization signifies the decline of the nation-state, especially with regard to sovereignty and political cultures. Hyper-globalists argue that globalization has engulfed today's world in such a way that state boundaries are beginning to lose significance. However, skeptics disregard this as naiveté, believing that the nation-state remains the supreme actor in international relations.

== Cyclical theories of globalization ==
=== George Modelski ===
George Modelski defines global order as a 'management network centred on a lead unit and contenders for leadership, (pursuing) collective action at the global level'. The system is allegedly cyclical. Each cycle is about 100 years in duration and a new hegemonic power appears each time:

- Portugal 1492-1580; in the Age of Discovery
- the Netherlands 1580-1689; beginning with the Eighty Years' War, 1579-1588
- United Kingdom (1) 1688-1792; beginning with the wars of Louis XVI
- United Kingdom (2) 1792-2000 beginning with the French Revolution and Napoleonic Wars
- the United States 1914 to (predicted) 2030; beginning with World War I and World War II.

Each cycle has four phases;

1, Global war, which a) involves almost all global powers, b) is 'characteristically naval' c) is caused by a system breakdown, d) is extremely lethal, e) results in a new global leader, capable of tackling global problems. The war is a 'decision process' analogous to a national election. The Thirty Years War, though lasting and destructive, was not a 'global war'

2, World power, which lasts for 'about one generation'. The new incumbent power 'prioritises global problems', mobilises a coalition, and is decisive and innovative. Pre-modern communities become dependent on the hegemonic power

3, Delegitimation. This phase can last for 20–27 years; the hegemonic power falters, as rival powers assert new nationalistic policies.

4, Deconcentration. The hegemony's problem-solving capacity declines. It yields to a multipolar order of warring rivals. Pre-modern communities become less dependent. A challenger appears (successively, Spain, France, France, Germany, and the USSR) and a new global war ensues.

The hegemonic nations tend to have: 'insular geography'; a stable, open society; a strong economy; strategic organisation, and strong political parties. By contrast, the 'challenger' nations have: closed systems; absolute rulers; domestic instability; and continental geographic locations.

The long cycle system is repetitive, but also evolutionary. According to Modelski, it originated in about 1493 through a) the decline of Venetian naval power, b) the abandonment of Chinese naval exploration, and c) the discovery of sea routes to India and the Americas. It has developed in parallel with the growth of the nation-state, political parties, command of the sea, and 'dependency of pre-modern communities'. The system is flawed, lacking in coherence, solidarity, and capacity to address the North-South divide. Modelski speculates that US deconcentration might be replaced by a power based in the 'Pacific rim' (Japan, China) or by an explicit coalition of nations, as 'co-operation is urgently required in respect of nuclear weapons'.

Modelski 'dismisses the idea that international relations are anarchic'. His research, influenced by Immanuel Wallerstein, was 'measured in decades... a major achievement' says Peter J. Taylor

=== Joshua S. Goldstein ===
Goldstein in 1989 posited a 'hegemony cycle' of 150 years' duration, the four hegemonic powers since 1494 being;

- Hapsburg Spain, 1494-1648; ended by the Thirty Years War, in which Spain itself was the 'challenger'; the Treaty of Westphalia and the beginnings of the nation-state.
- the Netherlands, 1648-1815; ended by the challenge from France of the revolutionary and Napoleonic wars, the Treaty of Vienna and the introduction of the Congress System
- Great Britain, 1815-1945; ended by Germany's challenge in two World Wars, and the postwar settlement, including the World Bank, IMF, GATT, the United Nations and NATO
- the United States, since 1945.

Goldstein suggests that US hegemony may 'at an indeterminate time' be challenged and ended by China (the 'best fit'), by western Europe, Japan, or (writing in 1989) the USSR. The situation is unstable due to the continuance of Machiavellian power politics and the deployment of nuclear weapons. The choice lies between 'global cooperation or global suicide'. Thus there may be 'an end to hegemony itself'.

Goldstein speculates that Venetian hegemony, ceded to Spain in 1494, may have begun in 1350

== See also ==
- Global civics
- Global politics
- Military globalization
- Political international
- Supranational union
- Transnational citizenship
- Transnationalism
