= Dimensions of globalization =

Aspects of globalization

Globalization has been said to have several main dimensions.

Manfred Steger, professor of Global Studies at the University of Hawaii at Manoa argues that globalization has four main dimensions: economic, political, cultural, and ecological, with ideological aspects of each category. David Held's book Global Transformations is organized around the same dimensions, though the ecological is not listed in the title. This set of categories relates to the four-domain approach of circles of social life, and Circles of Sustainability.

Steger compares the current study of globalization to the ancient Buddhist parable of blind scholars and their first encounter with an elephant. Similar to the blind scholars, some globalization scholars are too focused on compacting globalization into a singular process and clashes over “which aspect of social life constitutes its primary domain” prevail.

== Dimensions ==
=== Economic ===
Economic globalization is the intensification and stretching of economic interrelations around the globe. It encompasses such things as the emergence of a new global economic order, the internationalization of trade and finance, the changing power of transnational corporations, and the enhanced role of international economic institutions.

=== Political ===
Political globalization is the intensification and expansion of political interrelations around the globe. Aspects of political globalization include the modern-nation state system and its changing place in today's world, the role of global governance, and the direction of our global political systems.

=== Cultural ===
Cultural globalization is the intensification and expansion of cultural flows across the globe. Culture is a very broad concept and has many facets, but in the discussion on globalization, Steger means it to refer to “the symbolic construction, articulation, and dissemination of meaning.” Topics under this heading include discussion about the development of a global culture, or lack thereof, the role of the media in shaping our identities and desires, and the globalization of languages.

=== Ecological ===
Topics of ecological globalization include population growth, access to food, worldwide reduction in biodiversity, the gap between rich and poor as well as between the global North and global South, human-induced climate change, and global environmental degradation.

== Ideologies ==
According to Steger, there are three main types of globalisms (ideologies that endow the concept of globalization with particular values and meanings): market globalism, justice globalism, and religious globalisms. Steger defines them as follows:

- Market globalism seeks to endow ‘globalization’ with free-market norms and neoliberal meanings.
- Justice globalism constructs an alternative vision of globalization based on egalitarian ideals of global solidarity and distributive justice.
- Religious globalisms struggle against both market globalism and justice globalism as they seek to mobilize a religious values and beliefs that are thought to be under severe attack by the forces of secularism and consumerism.

These ideologies of globalization (or globalisms) then relate to broader imaginaries and ontologies.

== See also ==
- Cultural globalization
- Globalism
- Globalization
