= Cultural globalization =

Transmission of ideas, meanings and values around the world

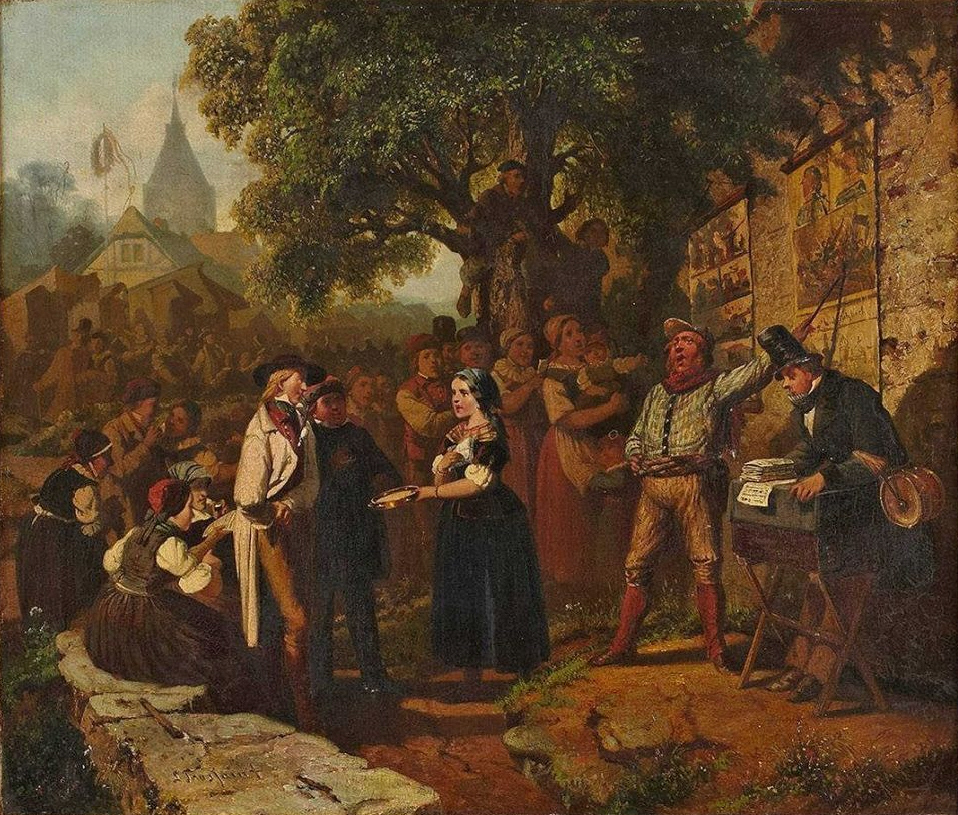
Painting of a turn-of-century trading fair, Hessisches Volksfest (Hessian Folk Festival), 1887, Louis Toussaint (1826–1887), oil on canvas

Cultural globalization is the accelerating transnational circulation of ideas, meanings, values, and cultural practices that reshape collective identities and social relations across geographic, linguistic, and political boundaries. This process is characterized by the common consumption of cultures that have been disseminated by the Internet, popular culture media, and international travel. This has contributed to the processes of commodity exchange and colonization, both of which have a longer history of carrying cultural meaning around the globe.

The creation and expansion of such social relations is not merely observed on a material level. Cultural globalization involves the formation of shared norms and knowledge with which people associate their individual and collective cultural identities. It brings increasing interconnectedness among different populations and cultures. The idea of cultural globalization emerged in the late 1980s, but was diffused widely by Western academics throughout the 1990s and early 2000s. For some researchers, the idea of cultural globalization is reaction to the claims made by critics of cultural imperialism in the 1970s and 1980s.

In essence, the phenomenon of the globalizing of culture is the unification of cultures to create one that is dominant across international borders. Some academics argue that, local cultures are being erased in favor of western thought or American values. Others argue that it is the natural progression of world following the advancement of technology and increase in the flow of commerce.

== Contributing factors ==
Macroregions, such as the European Union and North American Free Trade Agreement, are a substantial influence on the growth of cultural globalization. Increased flow of commerce across borders has resulted in increased cultural homogeneity and a decrease in nationalism. Technology, as well as the distribution of wealth internationally, have driven these cultural relationships through trade as well, especially in regards to the market for art. From the perspective of the supply side of the market, the development of new technologies give artists the ability to spread their creations across borders more easily. From the demand side, wealthy customers (in the western world in particular) have allowed the continual creation, appreciation, and spread of art from lesser developed countries. An example of this phenomenon would be the spread of reggae music in the United States.

The rise of popular culture, or pop-culture, has certainly contributed to the formation of a unified, homogenous world culture. Digital communication through websites such as YouTube, Spotify, or other social media platforms have allowed people from various backgrounds to share their personal culture and be exposed to that of others.

Intermingling between countries and their cultures can also be attributed to tourism and immigration across borders. This has become more apparent in contemporary times where travel is much more easily accessible due to advancements in transportation technologies. For example, the mass immigration of middle eastern refugees to Europe has shifted the demographics of the region significantly, having a ripple effect that is reflected in various European cultures. This has led to tensions between ethnic groups and an increase in xenophobic sentiment. One example that illustrates this tension is the ban of religious face coverings in France.

== Phases ==
=== Pre-modern phase: early civilizations to 1500 ===
- Early human migration (facilitation of trade and creation of social networks amongst other nations).
- Emergence of world religions.
- Development of trans-regional trade networks (long-distance trade, many centered in China and India. Early forms of globalization, especially with the Silk Road).

=== Modern phase ===
- European imperialism (rise of the West. European expansionism, especially with Columbus' encounter with the New World which allowed goods and people to cross the Atlantic).
- Emerging international economy.
- International migration and developments outside of the West.
- Spread of modernity.
- Medical advancement that helped many.
- Rise of the nation-state (a development of freedom of movement and cultural diffusion).
- Industrialization (demand for raw materials to supply industries. Science grew immensely with electronic shipping, railways, and new forms of communication, such as cable technology).

=== Contemporary phase ===
- Struggle after the cold war led to a slow but steady increase in cultural flows with the immigration of peoples, ideas, goods, symbols, and images.
- Represented global cultural interconnectedness, which eventually led to developments in transport and transport infrastructures such as jet airlines, construction of road and rail networks. This allowed for more tourism and shifting patterns of global migration.
- Marshall McLuhan introduced the term "global village" in the 1960s stating that it was the ability to connect and trade ideas instantly amongst the nations of the world.
- The term "globalization" became popular in the 1980s.

== Examples ==
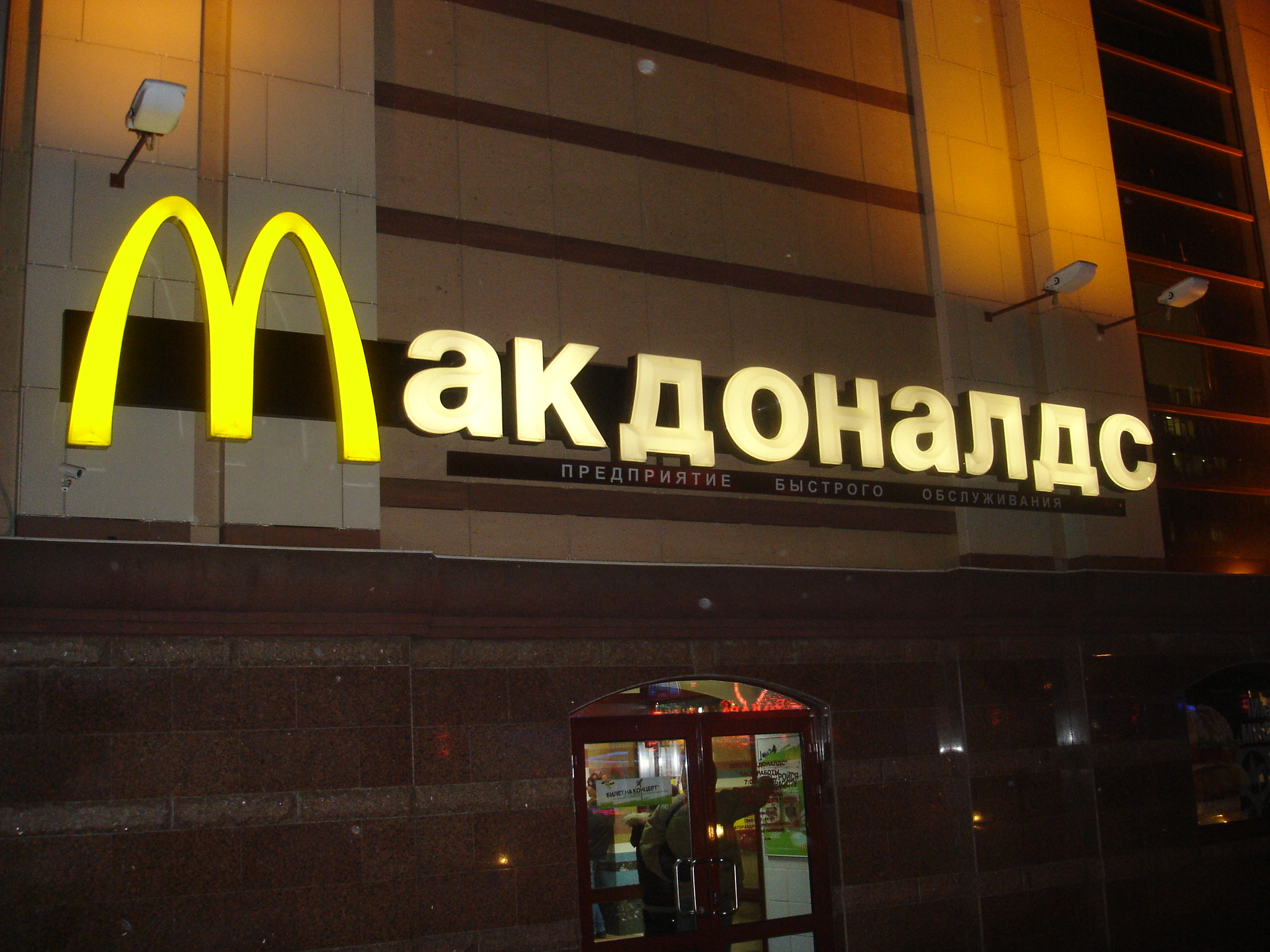
McDonald's in Russia

Cultural globalization integrates scholars from several disciplines, such as anthropology, sociology, communication, cultural studies, geography, political science and international relations. The field is notably broad as there are several concepts which may be perceived as cultural or transnational.

A visible aspect of the cultural globalization is the diffusion of certain cuisines such as American fast food chains. The two most successful global food and beverage outlets, McDonald's and Starbucks, are American companies often cited as examples of globalization, with over 36,000 and 24,000 locations operating worldwide respectively as of 2015. The Big Mac Index is an informal measure of purchasing power parity among world currencies.

Cultural globalization is one of the three main dimensions of globalization commonly found in academic literature, with the two other being economic globalization and political globalization. However, unlike economic and political globalization, cultural globalization has not been the subject of extensive research. A growing field in cultural globalization research corresponds to the implementation of cross-cultural agility in globally operating businesses as a management tool to ensure operational effectiveness.

== Measurement ==
There have been numerous attempts to measure globalization, typically using indices that capture quantitative data for trade flows, political integration, and other measures. The two most prominent are the AT Kearney/Foreign Policy Globalization index and the KOF Globalization Index. Cultural globalization, however, is much more difficult to capture using quantitative data, because it is difficult to find easily verifiable data of the flow of ideas, opinions, and fashions. One attempt to do so was the Cultural Globalization Index, proposed by Randolph Kluver and Wayne Fu in 2004, and initially published by Foreign Policy Magazine. This effort measured cultural flow by using global trade in media products (books, periodicals, and newspapers) as a proxy for cultural flow. Kluver and Fu followed up with an extended analysis, using this method to measure cultural globalization in Southeast Asia.

== Impacts ==
The patterns of cultural globalization is a way of spreading theories and ideas from one place to another. Although globalization has affected us economically and politically, it has also affected us socially on a wider scale. With the inequalities issues, such as race, ethnic and class systems, social inequalities play a part within those categories.

The past half-century has witnessed a trend towards globalization. Within the media and pop culture, it has shaped individuals to have certain attitudes that involve race issues thus leading to stereotypes.

Technology is an impact that created a bridge that diffused the globalization of culture. It brings together globalization, urbanization and migration and how it has affected today's trends. Before urban centers had developed, the idea of globalization after the Second World War was that globalization took place due to the lifting of state restrictions by different nations. There were national boundaries for the flow of goods and services, concepts and ideas.

== Perspectives ==
=== Hybridization ===
Many writers suggest that cultural globalization is a long-term historical process of bringing different cultures into interrelation. Jan Pieterse suggested that cultural globalization involves human integration and hybridization, arguing that it is possible to detect cultural mixing across continents and regions going back many centuries. They refer, for example, to the movement of religious practices, language and culture brought by Spanish colonization of the Americas. The Indian experience, to take another example, reveals both the pluralization of the impact of cultural globalization and its long-term history.

=== Homogenization ===
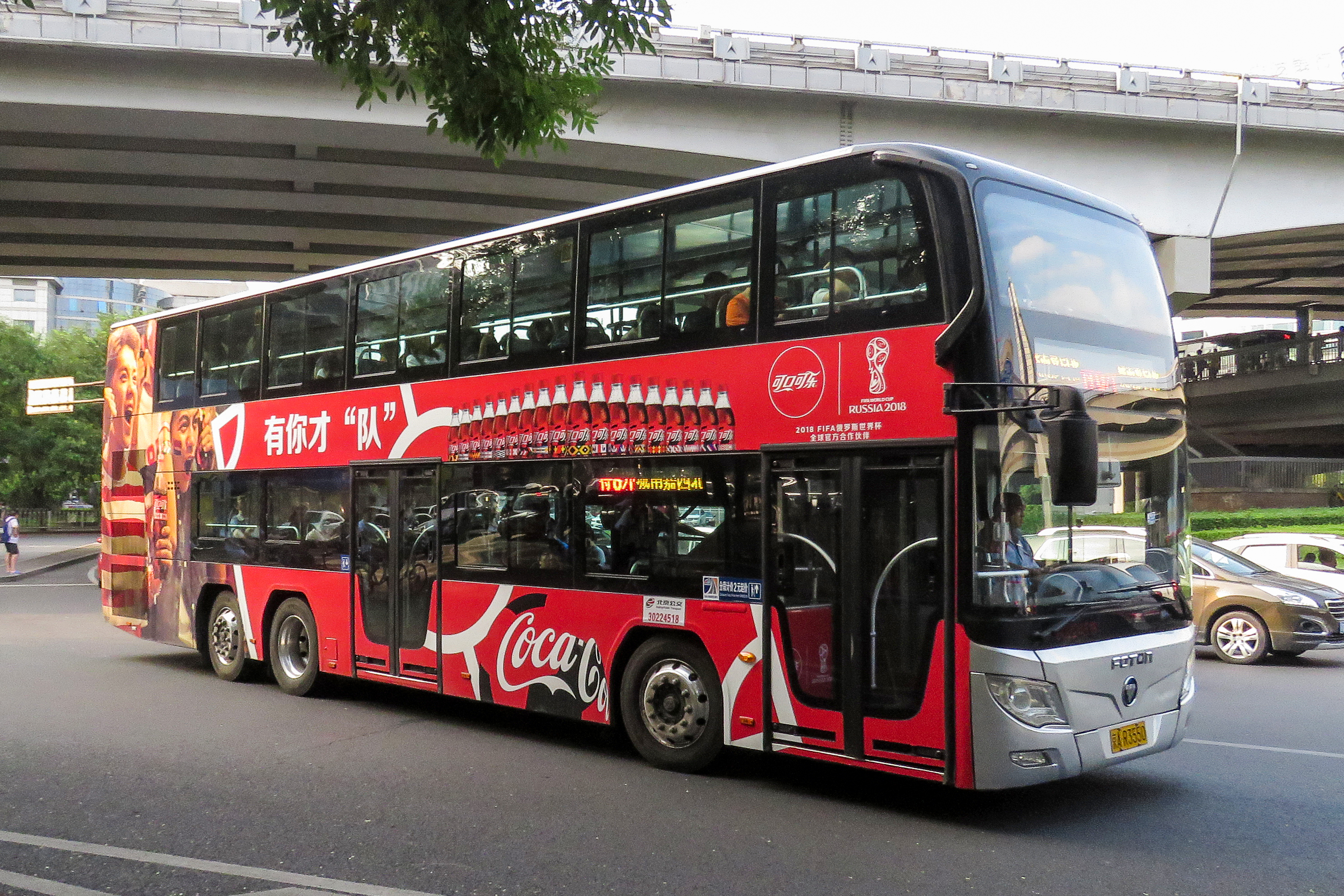
Coca-Cola's 2018 FIFA World Cup promotional scheme in Beijing

An alternative perspective on cultural globalization emphasizes the transfiguration of worldwide diversity into a uniformed Westernized consumer culture. Some critics argue that the dominance of American culture influencing the entire world will ultimately result in the end of cultural diversity. Such cultural globalization may lead to a human monoculture. This process, understood as cultural imperialism, is associated with the destruction of cultural identities, dominated by a homogenized and westernized, consumer culture. The global influence of American products, businesses and culture in other countries around the world has been referred to as Americanization. This influence is represented through that of American-based television programs which are rebroadcast throughout the world. Major American companies such as McDonald's and Coca-Cola have played a major role in the spread of American culture around the globe. Terms such as Coca-colonization have been coined to refer to the dominance of American products in foreign countries, which some critics of globalization view as a threat to the cultural identity of these nations.

=== Conflict intensification ===
Another alternative perspective argues that in reaction to the process of cultural globalization, a "Clash of Civilizations" might appear. Indeed, Samuel Huntington emphasizes the fact that while the world is becoming smaller and interconnected, the interactions between peoples of different cultures enhance the civilization consciousness that in turn invigorate differences. Indeed, rather than reaching a global cultural community, the differences in culture sharpened by this very process of cultural globalization will be a source of conflict. While not many commentators agree that this should be characterized as a 'Clash of Civilizations', there is general concurrence that cultural globalization is an ambivalent process bringing an intense sense of local difference and ideological contestation.

Alternatively, Benjamin Barber in his book Jihad vs. McWorld argues for a different "cultural division" of the world. In his book the McWorld represents a world of globalization and global connectivity and interdependence, looking to create a "commercially homogeneous global network". This global network is divided into four imperatives; Market, Resource, Information-Technology and the Ecological imperative. On the other hand, "Jihad" represents traditionalism and maintaining one's identity. Whereas "Clash of Civilizations" portrays a world with five coalitions of nation-states, "Jihad vs. McWorld" shows a world where struggles take place on a sub-national level. Although most of the western nations are capitalist and can be seen as "McWorld" countries, societies within these nations might be considered "Jihad" and vice versa.

=== Friction ===
Cultural globalization creates a more efficient society while also limiting how it can operate. Anna Tsing, an American anthropologist, in her book Friction: An Ethnography of Global Connection explains that Friction makes global connections between cultures effective while also preventing globalization from being a smooth transition of power.

Instead of globalization being about networks or a continuous flow, Tsing argues that we should think about it being created in two parts, the outside world (global) and the local. Globalization is seen as a friction between these two social organizations where globalization relies on the local for its success instead of just consuming it.

The rainforests in Indonesia exemplify how globalization is not a straightforward process, but one that is complex and messy. Capitalist interests reshaped the landscape through chains of entrepreneurs and other businesses that came in and extracted its resources to sell to distant markets. In response to these interactions, environmental movements emerged and began to defend the rainforests and the communities. This instance is not limited to just a nation or a village, but to several social organizations all at work. Environmental activists, students, local communities, private interests, and investors all have interacted with one another in regard to globalization. This exemplifies how globalization promotes interconnections between groups who are entirely different from one another into a single place.

Friction among social groups present risks of both potential destruction and improvement. Through this idea, globalization is not simply a tool used for networking and worldwide connection, nor is it an authoritarian flow of capital interest looking to take over local communities. Instead, globalization is viewed as a continuous engagement between various different social groups. While the destruction of the rainforest habitats through globalization is seen as a negative result, the emergence of local and national activists in response to these circumstances have led to more support for indigenous and environmental rights.

Globalization is often seen as homogenizing the world and includes a diffusion of beliefs that are eventually infused and accepted across time and space. Instead, globalization is about understanding and recognizing that communities are not the same and these differences are what make up the contemporary world. The friction between different groups is what keeps global power in continuous motion.

Corruption brought to the rainforest through capital interests highlight the struggle to find distinctions between the locals who are working for domestic development and those who are motivated by foreign investors and corporations. These distinctions add to the confusion globalization brings as it blurs the line between private and public. Outside motivations began to impact some of these reclusive communities who, up until this point, were considered untouchable or unaffected by globalization.

== See also ==
- Military globalization
- Engaged theory
- Globalism
- Globalization
- Cultural homogenization
- Cultural imperialism
- Globalization of sports
- Dimensions of globalization
