= Globalism =

Group of ideologies that advocate the concept of globalization

Globalism has multiple meanings. In political science, it is used to describe "attempts to understand all of the interconnections of the modern world—and to highlight patterns that underlie (and explain) them". While primarily associated with world-systems, it can be used to describe other global trends. The concept of globalism is also classically used to focus on ideologies of globalisation (the subjective meanings) instead of its processes (the objective practices); in this sense, "globalism" is to globalization what "nationalism" is to nationalisation. Globalism as a concept dates from the 1940s and became a dominant set of ideologies in the late twentieth century.

In the 21st century, the term "the globalists" was popularized by the US conspiracy theorist Alex Jones, and used interchangeably with the concepts of a New World Order and the deep state. The term is now frequently used as a pejorative by far-right movements and conspiracy theorists. This term is now heavily associated with antisemitism, as antisemites frequently appropriate the term "globalist" to refer to Jews.

== Definition ==
According to Paul James, an American academic, "globalism" is defined as

… the dominant ideology and subjectivity associated with different historically-dominant formations of global extension. The definition thus implies that there were pre-modern or traditional forms of globalism and globalization long before the driving force of capitalism sought to colonize every corner of the globe, for example, going back to the Roman Empire in the second century AD, and perhaps to the Greeks of the fifth-century BC.

Early ideas of globalism were also expressed by Adam Smith through his views on the role of commodities in distinguishing the civilized from the barbarous, which was deeply embedded in the ideology of empires. German Enlightenment writer Christoph Martin Wieland explored concepts of cosmopolitanism in his 1788 work The Secret of the Order of Cosmopolitans, which presented ideas about transcending national boundaries through enlightened thinking.

Manfred Steger distinguishes among different globalisms, such as justice globalism, jihad globalism, and market globalism. Market globalism includes the ideology of neoliberalism. In some hands, the reduction of globalism to the single ideology of market globalism and neoliberalism has led to confusion. In his 2005 book The Collapse of Globalism and the Reinvention of the World, Canadian philosopher John Ralston Saul treated globalism as coterminous with neoliberalism and neoliberal globalization. He argued that, far from being an inevitable force, globalization is already breaking up into contradictory pieces and that citizens are reasserting their national interests in both positive and destructive ways.

Political scientists Joseph Nye and Robert Keohane, major thinkers of liberal institutionalism as a new international relations theory, generalized the term to argue that globalism refers to any description and explanation of a world which is characterized by networks of connections that span multi-continental distances, while globalization refers to the increase or decline in the degree of globalism. The term is used in a specific and narrow way to describe a position in the debate about the historical character of globalization, such as whether globalization is unprecedented or not. For example, this use of the term originated in, and continues to be used, in academic debates about the economic, social, and cultural developments that is described as globalization.

Globalization has been used to describe international endeavours begun after World War II, such as the United Nations, the Warsaw Pact, the North Atlantic Treaty Organization and the European Union, and sometimes the later neoliberal and neoconservative policies of nation building and military interventionism between the end of the Cold War in 1991 and the beginning of the war on terror in 2001. Historically in the international relations of the 1970s and 1980s, globalism and regionalism had been defined somewhat differently due to the Cold War. Analysts discussed a globalism vs. regionalism dichotomy, in which globalists believed that international events more often arose from great power competition (then US–Soviet rivalry), whereas regionalists believed they more often arose from local factors.

== Concept ==
The term first entered widespread usage in the United States. The earliest use of the word is from 1943, in the book The War for Man's Soul by Ernst Jäckh, who used it to describe Adolf Hitler's global ambitions. While globalization became associated with economy, specifically economic integration, the origins of the concept are military rather than economic, bound to the Second World War and its "Air-Age Globalism." Examining the statistical analysis of published texts in English language provided by Google, Or Rosenboim found that the term global started to gain ground just after the outbreak of the War. The new global political space appeared as a response to total and all-encompassing nature of the war, facilitated by technological innovations. An awareness of the political significance of the globe as a unitary whole or “oneness,” became known as globalism.

In their position of unprecedented power, US planners formulated policies to shape the kind of postwar world they wanted, which in economic terms meant a globe-spanning capitalist order centered exclusively on the United States. This was the period when its global power was at its peak: the United States was the greatest economic power in the world, and had a powerful military machine,while many previously influential countries in Eurasia had been deeply affected by World War 2 and were still recovering. In February 1948, George F. Kennan's Policy Planning Staff said: "[W]e have about 50% of the world's wealth but only 6.3% of its population. ... Our real task in the coming period is to devise a pattern of relationships which will permit us to maintain this position of disparity." Historian James Peck has described this version of globalism as "visionary globalism". Per Peck, this was a far-reaching conception of "American-centric state globalism using capitalism as a key to its global reach, integrating everything that it can into such an undertaking". This included global economic integration, which had collapsed under World War I and the Great Depression.

Modern globalism has been linked to the ideas of economic and political integration of countries and economies. The first person in the United States of America to use the term "economic integration" in its modern sense, such as combining separate economies into larger economic regions, was John S. de Beers, an economist in the United States Department of the Treasury, towards the end of 1941. By 1948, economic integration was appearing in an increasing number of American documents and speeches. Paul G. Hoffman, then head of the Economic Cooperation Administration, used the term in a 1949 speech to the Organisation for European Economic Co-operation. The New York Times summarized it thus:

Mr Hoffmann used the word 'integration' fifteen times or almost once to every hundred words of his speech. It is a word that rarely if ever has been used by European statesmen having to do with the Marshall Plan to describe what should happen to Europe's economies. It was remarked that no such term or goal was included in the commitments the European nations gave in agreeing to the Marshall Plan. Consequently it appeared to the Europeans that 'integration' was an American doctrine that had been superimposed upon the mutual engagements made when the Marshall Plan began ...

Globalism emerged as a dominant set of ideologies in the late twentieth century. As these ideologies settled, and while various processes of globalization intensified, they contributed to the consolidation of a connecting global imaginary. In 2010, Manfred Steger and Paul James conceptualized this process in terms of four levels of change: changing ideas, ideologies, imaginaries and ontologies. Globalism has been seen as a pillar of a liberal international order along with democratic governance, open trade, and international institutions. At Brookings Institution, David G. Victor has suggested cooperation in carbon capture and storage technology could be a future element of globalism as part of global efforts against climate change.

== Usage in national politics ==
Globalist has been used as a pejorative in right-wing and far-right politics, and in various conspiracy theories, notably antisemitic tropes. In a 2014 YouTube video, far-right radio host and conspiracy theorist Alex Jones described the concept of globalism as a "global digital panopticon control system" which he considered to be "the total form of slavery".

Among the Christian right, particularly the Protestant right, globalism is an umbrella term which includes perceived secular aspects such as environmentalism, feminism, and socialism; globalism is believed to underlie the expansion of the New World Order – a prophesied enemy attempting to thwart Christianity – through organizations such as the European Union, United Nations, and World Trade Organization. Globalist values, promoted by the UN as a whole and the World Health Organization, among others, are perceived to be at odds with Christian values. UN conventions on discrimination against women and children's rights have thus been fiercely opposed by organizations and leading figures on the Christian right, such as Concerned Women for America, as methods to weaken parental rights, destroy the traditional family, and separate children from their religious and familial settings. The UN as satanic enemy is a theme in apocalyptic Christian media, such as the 1990s–2000s series Left Behind, in which the UN is run by the Antichrist, as well as Pat Robertson's 1991 New World Order and Hal Lindsey's 1994 book Planet Earth 2000 A.D.: Will Mankind Survive?.

During the 2016 US election and presidency of United States president Donald Trump, he and members of his administration used the term globalist on multiple occasions. The administration was accused of using the term as an antisemitic dog whistle, and to associate their critics with a Jewish conspiracy. Followers of the QAnon conspiracy theory refer to what they term "the Cabal" as a secret worldwide elite organisation who wish to undermine democracy and freedom, and implement their own globalist agendas. Hungary's former prime minister Viktor Orbán has used antisemitic tropes in accusations against globalists, espousing a conspiracy theory of a world network controlled by Hungarian-American philanthropist George Soros.

== See also ==
- Alter-globalization – Advocacy for globalization models prioritizing human rights, environment, and fairness
- Anti-globalization movement – Worldwide political movement against multinational corporations
- Cosmopolitanism – Idea that all human beings are members of a single community
- Cultural globalization – Transmission of ideas, meanings and values around the world
- Cultural imperialism – Cultural aspects of imperialism
- Dimensions of globalization – Aspects of globalization
- Global capitalism
- Global warming – Human-caused changes to climate on Earth
- Great Replacement conspiracy theory – Conspiracy theory about race and culture
- Information Age – Industrial shift to information technology
- Internationalism – Movement that advocates greater economic and political cooperation among nations
- Isolationism – Policy against engaging in international relations
- New World Order – Conspiracy theory regarding a totalitarian world government
- New world order (politics) – Period of history with a dramatic change in world political thought
- Post-industrial society – Service and knowledge-based society
- Power elite
- Rootless cosmopolitan – Soviet epithet used against Jewish intellectuals
- Ruling class – Social class that sets the rules of a society
- Techno-globalism – Social theory about globalization
- Triple parentheses – Antisemitic symbol
