= Techno-globalism =

Social theory about globalization

Techno-globalism is a social theory that aims to explain globalization using the spread of science and technology. Through the spread of science and technology, different nations and societies come together to form a more open and knowledge-based group which is characterized as "globalized". Broadly speaking, techno-globalism is establishing connections between individuals or groups of individuals using shared science and technological practices. In terms of form, techno-globalism can be expressed in macro and micro scales ranging from the interconnections of national economies to individual behavioral culture.

== Origins and background ==
Techno-globalism as a social theory emerged in the late 1990s following the end of the Cold War. During the Cold War, technology, especially military technology, acted as a separating force between the Soviet Union and the United States. Nuclear arms race and the space race are examples of the tension between the two superpowers created by science and technology. As a result, political and social theorists on globalization saw technology as a symbol of nationalism which many theorized as techno-nationalism. However, following the Cold War, global initiatives on cooperation in scientific research and technology development shed new light on the role that science and technology can play in globalization. Massive science projects often require co-funding of different nations and, more importantly, the sharing of knowledge among different nations. These projects signal a shift from technology as competition to technology as cooperation. Techno-globalism further permeates the globe by going beyond national scale and into the realm of individual behavior. Consumerism in the 21st century led to the widespread consumption of technology products that created common behavioral and cultural patterns among individuals around the world. The rise of the internet, smartphones and social media around the world create common values and behavioral patterns in people who have different national backgrounds. This trend of globalization on an individual level is supported by techno-globalism.

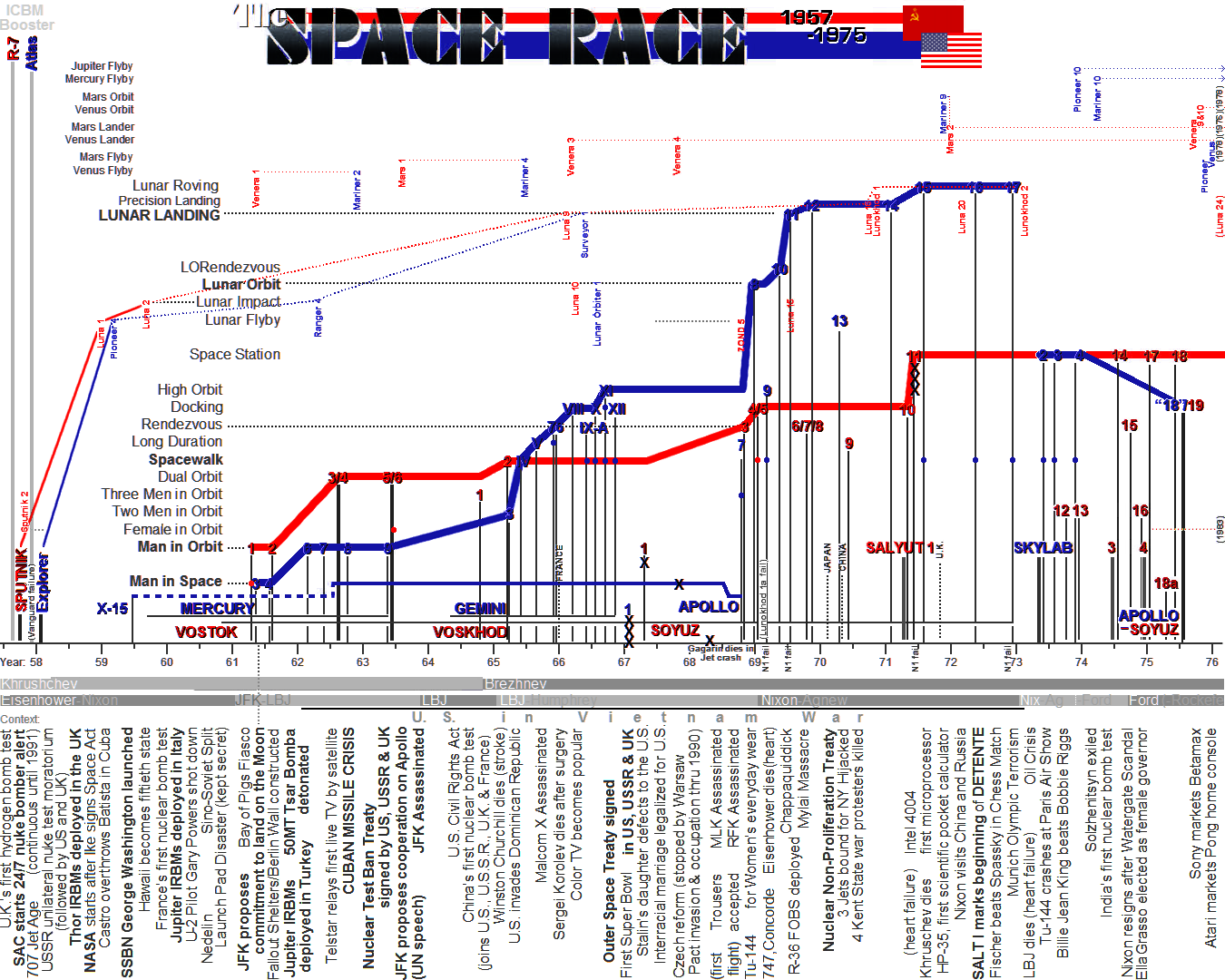
A timeline of major events during the space race between the Soviet Union and the United States

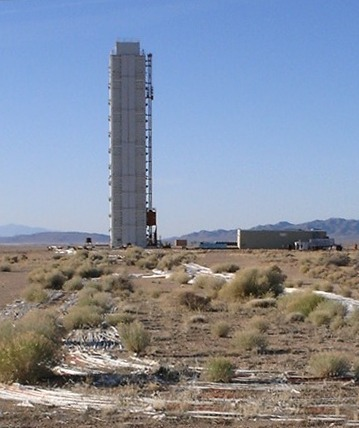
A nuclear testing site built during the Cold War

== Examples of techno-globalism on a national scale ==
Examples of techno-globalism can be found in the joint efforts of nations pursuing scientific knowledge or realizing ambitious engineering projects. Large-scale scientific research and engineering projects often require fundings and manpower beyond the capacity of a single nation. As such, nations are brought together under the common goal of science and technology which affirms techno-globalism.

The International Space Station is a low-orbit space project made possible by the cooperation of 15 countries. The first part of the space station was launched into space in 1998 and other parts of the space station followed. Since the space station is made up of individual parts, each country utilizes its strength to build one part and the parts are finally assembled in space. In that respect, the International Space Station is an embodiment of techno-globalism where nations share resources and information to achieve a common goal.

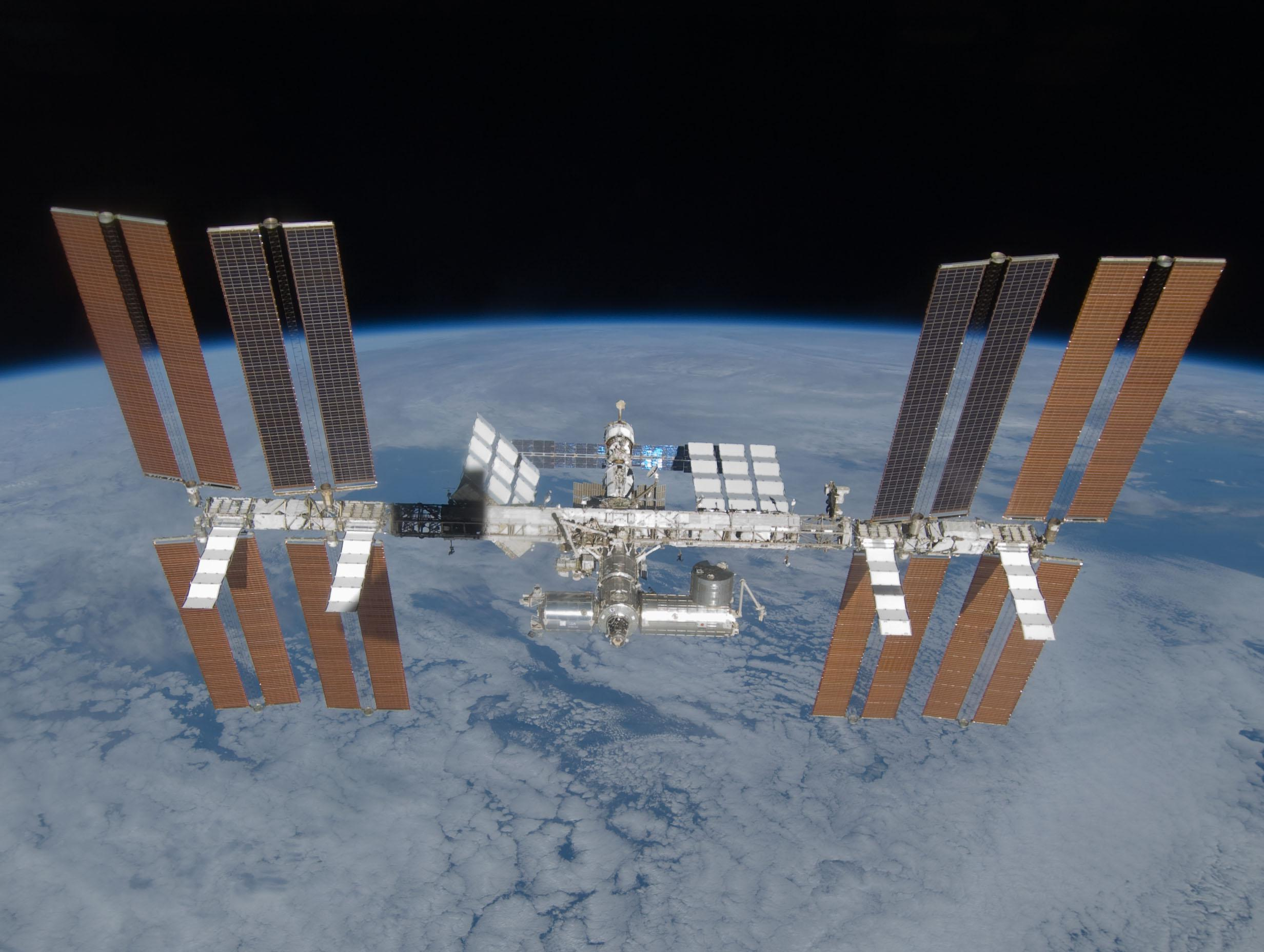
The International Space Station. A joint effort of fifteen countries to establish a space platform for research and exploration.

The Large Hadron Collider is another example of techno-globalism at a national scale. The LHC is the world's largest and most powerful particle accelerator and was built under the cooperation of more than 100 countries. In this case, both the construction and the utilization of the facility represent techno-globalism.

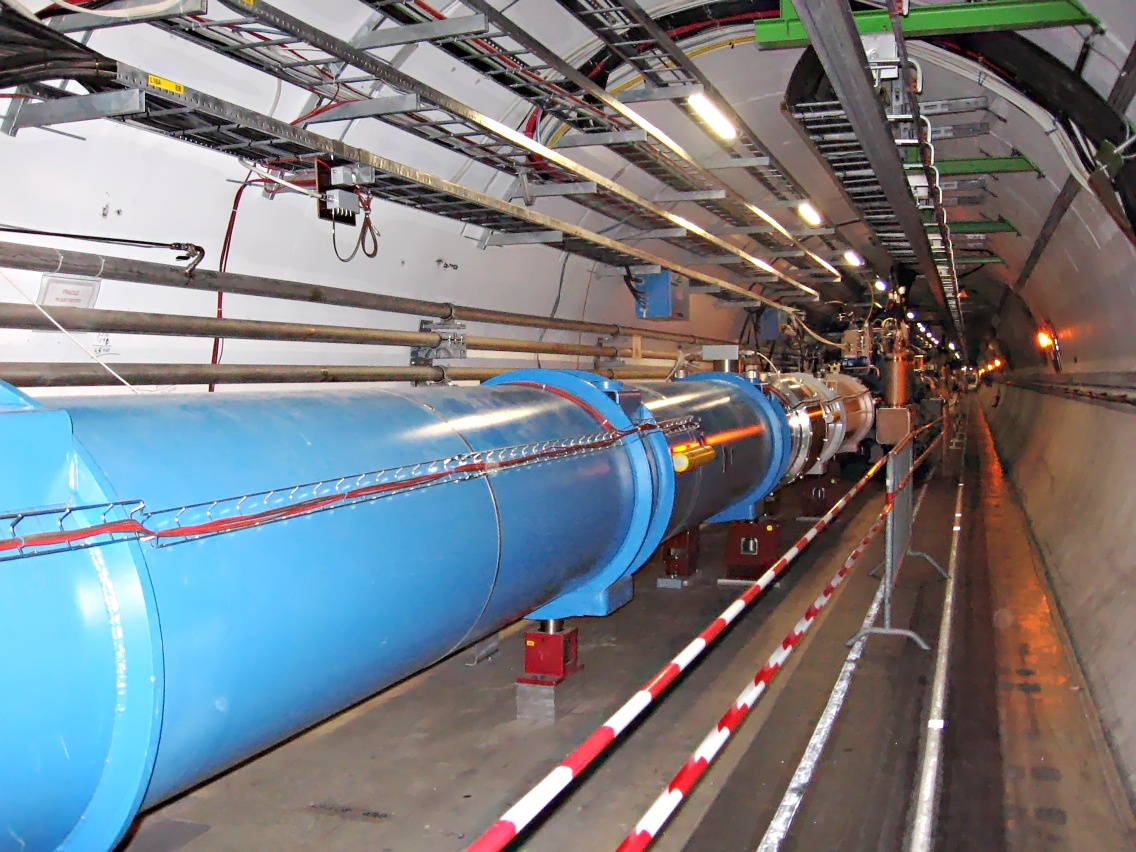
LHC at CERN

== Examples of techno-globalism on an individual scale ==
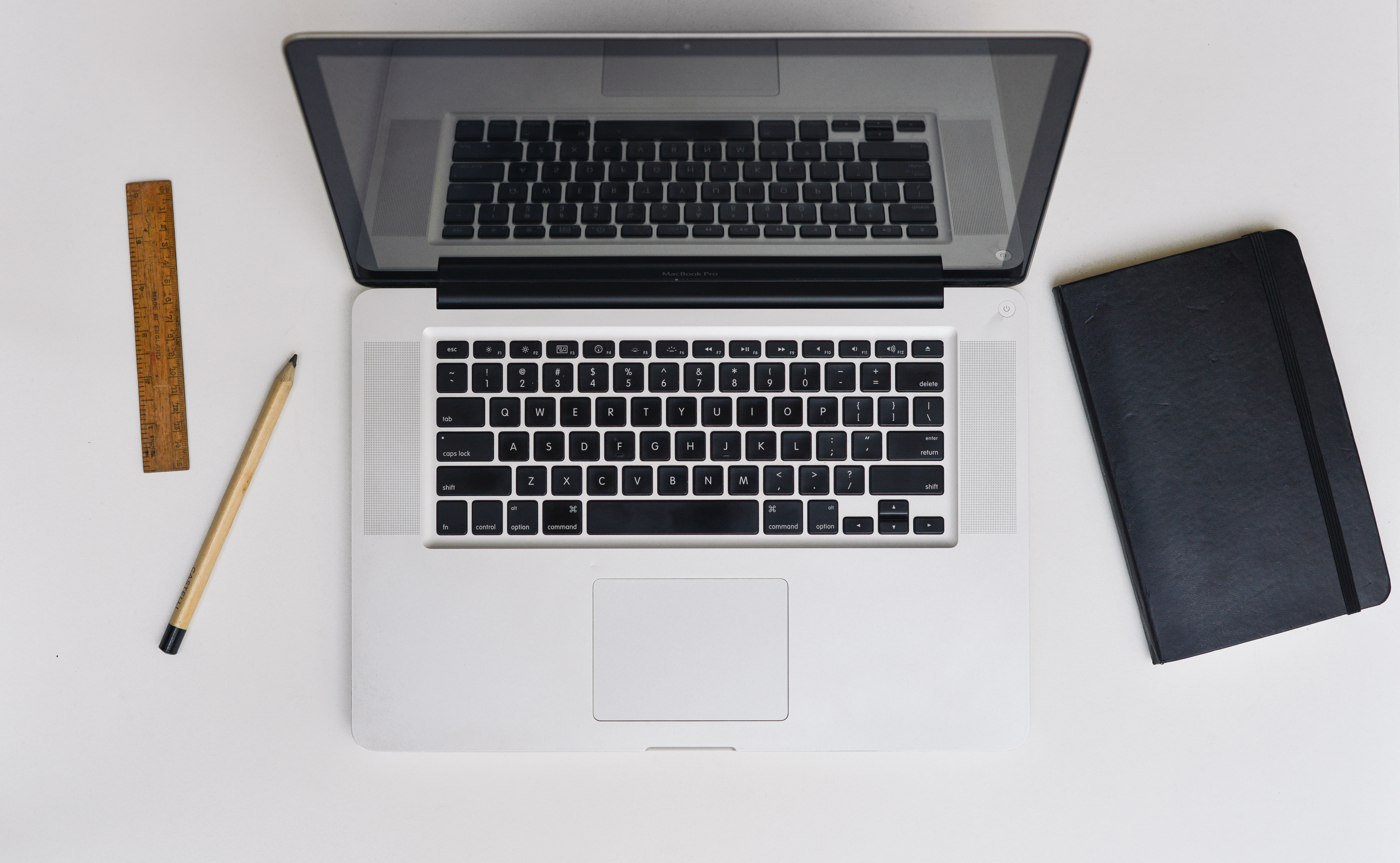
The MacBook Pro

Techno-globalism can impact the behaviors and values of individuals through the use of technology in people's daily lives.

The MacBook Pro is an example of techno-globalism from a consumer standpoint. China and the U.S., for instance, two countries with drastically different cultures and art tastes, have come to appreciate the engineering of this piece of technology.

== The impact of techno-globalism on science ==
Despite the many benefits that techno-globalism brings in terms of resources and cooperations, techno-globalism can pose certain challenges to the way that people deal with technology. Many existing policies regarding science and technology are inadequate to handle the fast-paced dynamics of techno-globalism due to their slow responses. Without the corresponding political infrastructure, techno-globalism would bring chaos into the field of science and technology since people would be trying to integrate parts of science inappropriately. On the other hand, techno-globalism could facilitate standardization in the science community. In the case of the LHC, scientists working at the LHC have the opportunity to work under a common setting which allows for better communication and integration of their academic works.

== Similar articles ==
- High-speed rail
