= Freight quality partnerships =

In the United Kingdom, Freight Quality Partnerships or FQPs are groups of transport operators and local authorities that come together to deal with matters of freight access and deliveries in a particular location. FQPs are regarded as best practice by the Department for Transport (DfT) Best practice is published by the Energy Savings Trust (on behalf of DfT).

In recent years there has been a shift of transportation companies and organizations that have consolidated these shipping resources in order to provide the end user with a better experience. Two booklets are available: "A guide on how to set up and run Freight Quality Partnerships", and "Freight Quality Partnerships - Case Studies"

Some of these are small geographically, i.e. covering only one business estate, e.g. Brimsdown Business Area in Enfield, whilst others cover larger areas, such as West London.

Some are funded by the members themselves, others by regional authorities, e.g. Transport for London (TfL). Freight Quality Partnerships are a key part of TfL's London Freight Plan. Transport for London hosts an umbrella website for London's FQPs

== FQPs ==
Within London the current FQPs are:

- Brimsdown FQP .
- Central London FQP, managed by the Central London Partnership .
- West London FQP , managed by MVA Consulting.
- South London FQP , managed by TTR Ltd.
- Thames Gateway FQP , managed by Intermodality.
- Islington FQP, managed by Steer Davies Gleave.

Outside of London there are many FQPs including:

- Cambridgeshire FQP.
- Oxfordshire FQP.
- Tyne and Wear FQP, managed by AECOM.

== Networks ==
The Freight Quality Partnership Network (FQPN) is a discussion forum available to members of the Freight Transport Association.

== See also ==
- Freight interline system
