= Sebastiano Maffettone =

Italian philosopher (born 1948)

Sebastiano Maffettone (Naples, 1 April 1948) is a political philosopher and University Professor at LUISS Guido Carli University of Rome, where he teaches Political Philosophy and Theories of Globalization. He has taught in several Italian universities (Turin, Palermo, Naples and Rome) as well as International universities (Harvard, Columbia, Boston College, Tufts University, Peking University, Paris, Mumbai, University of Pennsylvania to mention a few). Maffettone graduated summa cum laude from the University of Naples in 1970, and he completed his graduate studies in social philosophy LSE (London School of Economics) in 1976, under the supervision of philosophers such as Karl Popper and Amartya K. Sen.

== Early works ==
In the late 1970s, Maffettone translated into Italian A Theory of Justice, the work of the American philosopher John Rawls, whose influence defined the focus of Maffettone's philosophical approach. Rawls's liberal perspective and the liberal approach on social and political issues became the milestone of his lifelong research.

Committed to bringing Rawls's innovative thought to Europe, Maffettone begun to be widely known for his active participation in the academic life, earning the merit of having introduced important scientific novelties, especially in the Italian cultural debate. Besides his growing academic production, Maffettone started to contribute to the public debate through collaborations with major Italian newspapers such as Corriere della Sera, Il Mattino, Il Messaggero, Il Sole24ore and magazines such as Panorama, L’Espresso, and Reset. For his commitment in the current public debate, Maffettone is considered a public intellectual.

He has also founded and edited philosophy journals (Notizie di Politeia and Filosofia e Questioni Pubbliche, now Philosophy and Public Issues) and research centers (Politeia, Centro per la Ricerca e lo Studio dei Diritti Umani, Center for Ethics and Global Politics, ETHOS observatory), published scholarly articles on different subjects, and contributed to the public debate on various cultural issues thanks to a wide network of international relationships, participation in seminars, workshops and conferences in Italy and abroad.

One of Maffettone's contributions to the Italian academy probably is the creation of the Società Italiana di Filosofia Politica (the Italian Society of Political Philosophy, of which he was the first President). Under his presidency, the society became a point of reference for the Italian political philosophers, and the political life of the country.

== Main works ==
Maffettone is author of about 30 volumes, many of which have deeply influenced European scientific community. Two of his books, Il Valore della Vita (1998), and Etica Pubblica (2001) bridge the gap between applied ethics and political theory, which represents a recurrent theme of Maffettone's philosophical project. Il Valore della Vita presents a rationalist and liberal Lebenphilosophie. Its basic underpinnings come from bioethics, but go beyond this and propose a non-religious, comprehensive theory of life. Etica Pubblica grounds a public understanding of ethics, which the author brought to the attention of the Italian public. The most widely read and criticized chapters were those on business ethics. It is worth noting how, in the case of both these books, theoretical and practical experiences have found a felicitous convergence.

Together with Ronald Dworkin, Maffettone published I Fondamenti del Liberalismo (2008) in which the two authors present their views of liberalism, agreeing in some areas and diverging on others, to begin with the relationship between ethics and politics. This book opened an important critical discussion on liberalism in Italy, which is still ongoing these very days.

Recently, the most importance evidence of his intellectual achievements can be seen in his book La Pensabilità del Mondo, where he presents an original theory within the field of ethics of international relations. Maffettone's view is based on the idea of “pluralistic integration”, which tries to represent an alternative to cosmopolitanism. The core idea is that liberalism and democracy cannot be imposed from the outside but must come from inside a culture or a nation. The same kind of argument was cashed out in two articles in English, one on the European model of “normative regionalism” (published in “The Monist”), the other on global justice (forthcoming in the collective UNESCO volume). His works have been published in many languages such as English, Spanish, French, Portuguese and Arab.

Among his last publications, there is a solid and comprehensive introduction to the thought of John Rawls (“Rawls: An Introduction”, Polity Press 2010). In this work, Maffettone interprets Rawls along three hermeneutical hypotheses: the interpretive hypothesis; the methodological hypothesis; and the theoretical hypothesis. The interpretive hypothesis concerns the much-debated question of the continuity or discontinuity between Rawls 1 (1950–80) and Rawls 2 (1980–2002). Prima facie, discontinuity seems to prevail, given that Rawls’ main books discuss three different subjects: A Theory of Justice deals with social justice; Political Liberalism deals with the main flaws of A Theory of Justice as well as with political legitimacy; The Law of Peoples extends and modifies the previous model in the light of global justice. However, after reflection one can detect a substantial continuity. Of course, there are significant partial discontinuities, like the ones Rawls enjoins with regard to rational choice theory and, more relevantly, with regard to some passages within the third part of A Theory of Justice concerning stability. The methodological hypothesis is designed to complement the interpretive hypothesis by presenting a unitary thread through which we can trigger the desired continuity in our reading of Rawls. This thread follows the basic device Rawls never abandoned, namely the ‘priority of the right’. The theoretical hypothesis is based on the idea that the asymmetry between the right and the good depends on a deeper dialectics between justification and legitimation. According to this distinction, justification looks for the best theoretical argument, is intrinsically substantive, goes top-down and is rooted in the moral and metaphysical bases of a specific culture. Legitimation, on the other hand, is normally based on an institutional practice, concerns mainly the inputs of a political process, goes bottom- up and does not directly appeal to the moral and metaphysical roots of a culture. Maffettone claims that justification and legitimation must be seen as complementary. Assuming the fact of pluralism in contemporary liberal-democratic societies, we can have different plausible justifications in reciprocal conflict, but we have to rely on the same institutional legitimation for the sake of stability (for the right reasons).

== Main contribution to the Italian debate ==
Regarding bioethics, Maffettone was a member of what was probably the first Italian ethical commission in a hospital, under the direction of Umberto Veronesi (with whom Maffettone worked) at the Istituto Tumori, based in Milan.

Maffettone also formulated the theoretical outline of business ethics, which is perhaps the most important Italian deontological code; moreover, he wrote many other codes and formulated other social budgets – among which the one proposed to Confindustria in 1992 in an extremely delicate political and social moment for Italy.

Maffettone's synthesis of theoretical reflections and practical applications can be tracked also in his participation to the scientific commissions of influential cultural foundations (like the Fondazione Adriano Olivetti and the Fondazione Einaudi in Rome), and as a consultant on applied-science issues for institutions such as ENEA, CISPEL and MIUR.

Maffettone is most certainly among the Italian scholars with the strongest connections with foreign academic and scientific institutions. Several times he has been awarded a visiting professorship in the most prestigious American Universities (such as Harvard, NYU, Columbia, Tufts, Boston College). He was also a Senior Fellow “Ethics and Professions” program at Harvard University, and visiting professor in France (in the Maison des Sciences de l’Homme and at Sciences-Po in Paris), as well as in England (LSE) and in India. He has held lectures and courses in more than forty countries (just in the last two years in China, India, France, Great Britain, the United States, and Austria, to name a few), and he took part in many international conferences, publishing his contributions in the conference proceedings.

Maffettone's commitment to promote research programs with an international relevance is lastly manifest in creation of a doctoral program in Political Theory at LUISS, one of the first program taught in English, which sees the participation of many worldwide recognized scholars.

== Selected publications ==
- 1976: IL DUBBIO CARTESIANO, Liguori, Napoli
- 1980: CRITICA E ANALISI, Liguori, Napoli
- 1982: UTILITARISMO E TEORIA DELLA GIUSTIZIA, Bibliopolis, Napoli
- 1984 : VERSO UN'ETICA PUBBLICA, E.S.I., Napoli
- 1988: PRENDERE SUL SERIO DWORKIN, Edizioni Suor Orsola Benincasa, Napoli
- 1989: VALORI COMUNI, Il Saggiatore, Milano
- 1990: PILLOLE PER DORMIRE, Edizioni del Gallo, Roma
- 1992: ERMENEUTICA E SCELTA COLLETTIVA, Guida, Napoli
- 1992: LE RAGIONI DEGLI ALTRI, Il Saggiatore, Milano
- 1996: (with Ronald Dworkin), I FONDAMENTI DEL LIBERALISMO, Laterza, Roma-Bari
- 1998: Il VALORE DELLA VITA, Mondadori, Milano
- 2000: ETICA PUBBLICA, il Saggiatore, Milano
- 2006: LA PENSABILITA’ DEL MONDO, il Saggiatore, Milano
- 2010: JOHN RAWLS, AN INTRODUCTION, Polity Press, Cambridge, UK
