= David M. Rasmussen =

American philosopher

David M. Rasmussen is an American philosopher and professor at Boston College. He is the founder and editor in chief of Philosophy and Social Criticism and is a noted political and social philosopher.

Rasmussen is the author of 21 books, widely held at libraries, including Reading Habermas and Handbook of Critical Theory, and has written extensively on international justice and human rights. He currently serves on the executive committee of the Society of Phenomenology and Existential Philosophy.

He received his A.A. from Grand View College in 1956, his B.A. from the University of Minnesota in 1958, and a B.D., M.A., and Ph.D. from the University of Chicago in 1962, 1965, and 1968 respectively.
