= SDG Publishers Compact =

Non-binding United Nations pact

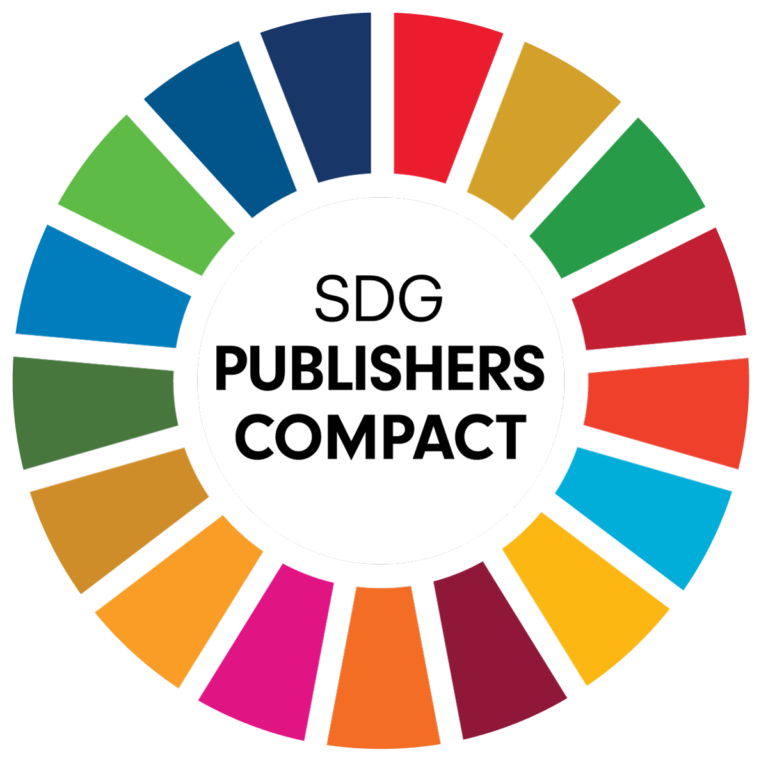
- Formation: 2020; 6 years ago
- Type: Framework and mechanism
- Legal status: Active
- Parent organization: United Nations and International Publishers Association
- Website: www.un.org/sustainabledevelopment/sdg-publishers-compact/

The United Nations SDG Publishers Compact is a non-binding United Nations pact open to publishers, associations, booksellers and other organizations involved in the publishing industry, in support of the United Nations 17 Sustainable Development Goals (SDGs). Research and education is important to making progress toward achieving the 17 development goals.

The SDG Publishers Compact contains 10 commitments for signatories to take in support of reaching the 17 development goals by 2030. Signatories are encouraged both to develop sustainable practices within their own industry and to "inform, develop, and inspire action" on the SDGs worldwide through the publication of relevant books, journals and other materials.

As of February 19, 2023, 285 organizations worldwide were signatories of the SDG Publishers Compact, including 15 international and national publishers associations. An action group and signatory of the Compact, known as the SDG Publishers Compact Fellows, translates the ten commitments into actionable steps. The SDG Compact Fellows develop detailed action lists and tip sheets for use by signatories and other supporters. Member organizations are taking a wide variety of actions in support of the SDGs.

== Formation ==
Development of the SDG Publishers Compact followed the creation of the Sustainable Development Goals Book Club, organized in 2018 and launched at the 2019 Bologna Children's Book Fair. The International Publishers Association (IPA) and others partnered to release a reading list of books appropriate for children ages 6- to 12, with a monthly focus on Sustainable Development Goals. The first month's reading list focused on SDG 1: No Poverty, and included both newer works such as A Chair for My Mother by Vera B. Williams and older public domain titles such as The Prince and the Pauper by Mark Twain. Books were listed in the six official UN languages: Arabic, Chinese, English, French, Russian, and Spanish. Local chapters of the SDG Book Club formed in Norway, Indonesia, Brazil, Africa, Portugal, and Germany, working with librarians, teachers, and parents. The intention was to support young people in understanding and dealing with the SDGs in their daily lives.

Development of the SDG Publishers Compact was further informed by the 2020 IPA report of publisher's activities relating to the SDGs, Publishers and the United Nations Sustainable Development Goals. The report outlined the ways in which the SDGs are relevant to the publishing industry, with a strong emphasis on ways to take action.

The SDG Publishers Compact was formally launched by the non-profit International Publishers Association (IPA) and the United Nations and the first signatories were announced on 14 October 2020 at the Frankfurt Book Fair. The SDG Publishers Compact was presented by Juergen Boos, President and CEO of the Frankfurt Book Fair, Hugo Setzer and Michiel Kolman of the International Publishers Association (IPA), Sherri Aldis for the United Nations and Nadja Kneissler for the German Publishers and Booksellers Association.

== Commitments ==
The UN asks signatories to the SDG Publishers Compact to commit to 10 action points, in support of reaching the Sustainable Development Goals (SDGs) by 2030.

"Signatories to the SDG Publishers Compact commit to:

1. Committing to the SDGs: Stating sustainability policies and targets on our website [the signatory's site], including adherence to this compact; incorporating SDGs and their targets as appropriate.
2. Actively promoting and acquiring content that advocates for themes represented by the SDGs, such as equality, sustainability, justice, and safeguarding and strengthening the environment.
3. Annually reporting on progress toward achieving SDGs, sharing data and contributing to benchmarking activities, helping to share best practices and identifying gaps that still need to be addressed.
4. Nominating a person [in the signatory company] who will promote SDG progress, acting as a point of contact and coordinating the SDG themes throughout the organization.
5. Raising awareness and promoting the SDGs among staffers to increase awareness of SDG-related policies and goals and encouraging projects that will help achieve the SDGs by 2030.
6. Raising awareness and promoting the SDGs among suppliers, to advocate for SDGs and to collaborate on areas that need innovative actions and solutions.
7. Becoming an advocate to customers and stakeholders by promoting and actively communicating about the SDG agenda through marketing, sites online, promotions and projects.
8. Collaborating across cities, countries, and continents with other signatories and organizations to develop, localize, and scale projects that will advance progress on the SDGs individually or through their [the company's] Publishing Association.
9. Dedicating budget and other resources toward accelerating progress for SDG-dedicated projects and promoting SDG principles.
10. Taking action on at least one SDG goal—either as an individual publisher or through your national publishing association—and sharing progress annually."

== Signatories ==
After launching in 2020, the SDG Publishers Compact gained 100 signatories in its first nine months. As of July 23, 2022, 226 publishers and other organizations worldwide were signatories to the Compact. Approximately 1/2 were from Europe (116) and 1/5 from the Americas (47), followed by Asia and the Pacific (41), Africa (16) and the Middle East (6). By country, the most signatories were from the UK (46), the USA (21), Germany (15), India (13), and Turkey (13). As of February 19, 2023, 285 organizations were signatories (Europe 139, Asia-Pacific 62, Americas 59, Africa 19, Middle East 6).

As of February 19, 2023, 15 publishers associations were signatories of the SDG Publishers Compact. The Compact is supported by international publishing societies including the International Publishers Association, the International Association of Scientific, Technical, and Medical Publishers (STM) the Association of Learned and Professional Society Publishers (ALPSP), the Association of University Presses, and the European Association of Science Editors (EASE). National publishing societies who are signatories include the German Publishers and Booksellers Association, Syndicat national de l'édition (France) Fédération Nationale de la Presse d'information Spécialisée (France), The Publishers Association (PA, United Kingdom) and Canadian Science Publishing (CSP). In 2024 Clarivate Plc has signed the Publishers Compact.

== Fellows ==
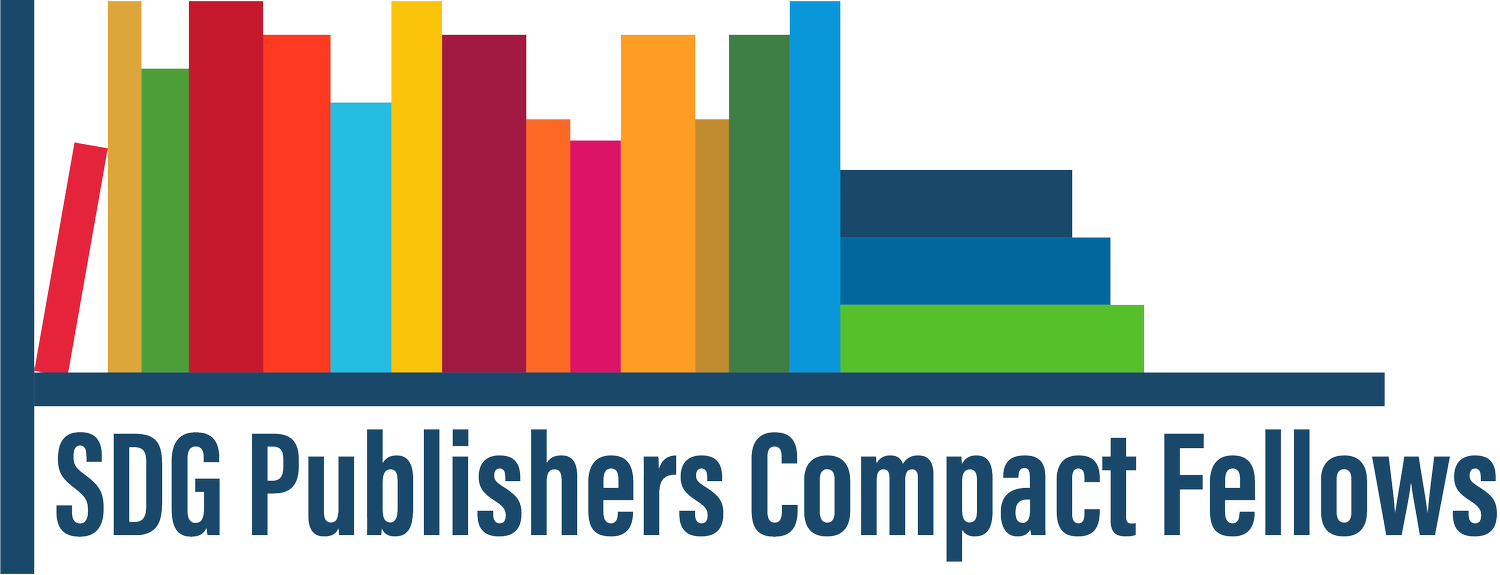
SDG Publishers Compact Fellows logo

The SDG Publishers Compact Fellows are an action group established by the UN's Higher Education Sustainability Initiative (HESI). HESI is an open partnership involving the higher education community and UN entities such as UN DESA, UN-Habitat, UNEP, UNESCO, and UNU. HESI follows the UN Global Compact's Principles for Responsible Management Education (PRME). HESI sought input from sustainability experts, practitioners, and academics to form a working group of multiple stakeholders to consider ways in which the publishing industry could support the SDGs.

HESI, the SDG Publishers Compact, and the Fellows Action group are all examples of partnerships (SDG 17). The Fellows action group is itself a signatory of the SDG Publishers Compact. As of 2023 the group co-chairs were Debra Rowe and Roger P. Worthington.

The SDG Publishers Compact Fellows' aims are to make SDG research and publications discoverable and applicable and to encourage the implementation of the SDGs. They encourage publishers to prioritize the SDGs in research and education (SDG 4) and to integrate the SDGs into their organizations and workflows (SDG 9). The 22 Fellows develop basic guidelines and best practices, translating the broad commitments of the Compact into practical policies and steps for adoption. Fellows provide practical tools and actionable guidance in support of a community of practice. Their action lists and tip sheets suggest ways in which authors, editors, researchers, students, publishers, librarians and others can carry out the 10 commitments and implement the 17 SDGs.

The action group has formed four workstreams to develop guidelines for aligning education and research with the UN Sustainable Development Goals (SDGs). Workstreams focus on:

- Academic Societies and Textbooks: Integration of SDG-related content into educational materials
- Connecting Academic Researchers and Practitioners: Best practices for communication between researchers and practitioners, including formats such as a synopsis of content
- Impact and Reach: Development of new standards for assessing research impact, and standardized terminology for use by researchers, publishers and policymakers
- Higher Education: Broad incorporation of SDGs into the larger academic and publishing ecosystem

== Actions ==
Publishing associations are taking a wide variety of actions in support of the SDGs including establishing internal policies; forming leadership groups for organizational sustainability; developing written manifestos, principles, best practices, initiatives, tools and repositories for members to use; organizing conferences and sessions; introducing awards to recognize and encourage important contributions and model initiatives; preparing and presenting information relevant to the SDGs to a wide variety of audiences; and teaching skills for better connecting with practitioners, policymakers and the public.

The SDG Publishers Compact Fellows provide action lists and tip sheets outlining ways in which authors, editors, researchers, students, publishers, librarians and others can support the 10 commitments and implement the SDGs. For example, academic authors can consider the relevance of their work to the SDGs and use relevant keywords and terminology. (Non-academic authors can also take steps, like specifying the use of sustainably sourced paper as part of their contracts.) Publishers can explicitly commit to the SDGs in vision and purpose statements and connect journals and other publications specifically to SDGs. Editors and peer review processes at institutions can support research that is being translated into practice. Research societies can create awards to recognize significant work relating to the SDGs. Librarians and publishers can implement methodologies to increase the findability of SDG-related content and to track and assess the impact of publishing on the SDGs.

In agreement with the Compact's Action Point 10, individual publishers such as Emerald Publishing, IOS Press, Oxford University Press, Springer Nature, and Wiley have publicly disclosed sustainability reports of their actions. Impacts of the SDGs can be categorized as discursive, normative (legislative/regulatory) and institutional.

=== Discursive effects ===
Discursive effects are changes in the way people and institutions understand and communicate. This includes explicitly referencing the goals, targets and provisions of the 2030 Agenda. As early as 2018, Emerald Publishing issued a Real Impact Manifesto, challenging publishers and the research community to reconsider their operations in terms of impact and sustainability.

In 2021, the European Association of Science Editors (EASE) published an Environmental Manifesto outlining a variety of environmentally responsible actions for publishers and others. Digital publication, the role of editors, and improvements in journal distribution are particularly relevant to publishers, but the adoption of an environment policy and improvements in office, employee, food, and building management are broadly applicable to other types of organizations.

Also in 2021, the International Publishers Association (IPA) created the IPA SDG Dashboard, a repository for information about how publishers are addressing the SDGs. The International Association of Scientific, Technical, and Medical Publishers (STM) has officially endorsed the SDG Fellows action suggestions and established its own SDGs Academic Publishers Forum in 2022 to provide information and support.

Several awards have been created to acknowledge and encourage SDG-related initiatives. The Association of Learned and Professional Society Publishers (ALPSP) and Cambridge University Press launched the University Press Redux Sustainability Award in 2020. The inaugural award was given to the Organisation for Economic Co-operation and Development (OECD) for its SDG Pathfinder, an open-access digital discovery tool for finding content and data relating to the SDGs. Also recognized were Taylor & Francis' Sustainable Development Goals Online (SDG Online), an online library curated around the alignment of publishing with the SDGs and Bristol University Press' "brilliant publishing" imprint, Policy Press, formed in 1995 to address sustainability and development issues.

=== Normative effects ===
In terms of legislative and regulatory frameworks and policies, the UN's 17 Sustainable Development Goals form the central normative framework of worldwide sustainable development. Creation of the SDG Publishers Compact provides a voluntary actionable framework for application of the SGDs in the publishing industry.

Initiatives such as the San Francisco Declaration on Research Assessment (DORA) are suggesting a rethinking of academic reward and incentives structures, to more broadly examine the impact and quality of scholarly research, and develop best practices.

The introduction of impact ratings specific to the SDGs has also been suggested. The Times Higher Education Impact Rankings assess universities in terms of their performance on the SDGs. In 2022, 1,524 institutions participated, from 110 countries and regions. In 2023, universities from Australian and Canada dominated the top 10 overall rankings, along with Great Britain in the top 100. This ranking and its methodology have raised concerns.

Cabells and Saint Joseph's University's Haub School of Business have launched the SDG Impact Intensity system for academic journal rating. The underlying SDG-Intense Evaluation framework (SDGIE) can be applied to a wide range of textual data sets and is suggested as a benchmark structure for standardizing AI approaches to the SDGs.

An SDG Impact Intensity pilot study including fifty well-known business and management journals selected by the Financial Times (the FT50) found that journals that were traditionally ranked highly in business and marketing ranked poorly when rated in SDG-related areas such as sustainability, environmental management, public policy and ethics. Of the 100 journals assessed, the 6 that received the highest possible "Five Wheel" impact rating were Smart and Sustainable Built Environment and Gender in Management (Emerald Publishing); Environment, Development and Sustainability (Springer Nature); Globalization and Health (BioMed Central); International Journal of Sustainable Development and World Ecology (Taylor & Francis) and Natural Resources Forum (Wiley-Blackwell Publishing).

=== Institutional effects ===
Institutional effects can include the creation of new departments, committees, and programmes to address the achievement of the SDGs, as well the review and realignment of existing institutional structures to better support the SDGs.

The International Association of Scientific, Technical, and Medical Publishers (STM) groups ways in which publishers can address the SDGs into two broad areas: "How we publish", addressing sustainability when dealing with internal workflows, processes, and suppliers, and "What we publish", providing needed SDG-related content to broad audiences in ways that will have real-life impact.

==== Publishing ====
Running any business or organization uses resources and affects the SDGs, in particular SDG 12 (responsible consumption and production). Carnstone started the Book Chain Project (BCP) in 2006, to gather, evaluate and share information about ethical publishing supply chains worldwide. BCP gathers information relating to types of trees, sourcing from forests, pulp and paper mill operations, publication-related chemicals and materials such as ink, varnish, and adhesives; labor standards; and environmental impacts. Its Accountability Framework helps to establish standards that can be used worldwide. Through forest certification and forest risk assessment, BCP identifies "deforestation-risk countries" and "transshipment-risk countries". BCP carries out fibre analysis of paper from such countries and checks the conservation status of pulp type and tree species against the IUCN Red List and CITES when grading products. Paper manufacturers, print suppliers, and book and journal publishers can use this information when making supply chain buying decisions. As of 2022, BCP's Design Guide for the publishing industry includes data on emissions factors for key publishing-related materials and processes.

Accreditation systems related to printing supply chains are also used to check suppliers. Forest Stewardship Council (FSC) Chain of Custody certification requires certified companies to monitor their supply chains and trace products to their forest of origin. The Programme for the Endorsement of Forest Certification (PEFC) Chain of Custody certifies timber and paper products as deriving from responsibly managed forests, and attempts to reconcile certification schemes from international forests.

In 2022, Börsenverein (German Publishers and Booksellers Association) formed a Sustainability Working Group with three Task Forces. Task Force 1 focuses on production and logistics, including the development of standards for sustainable production and packaging. Task Force 2 is focused on sustainability reporting, to better understand current reporting obligations and uniform standards such as the European Sustainability Reporting Standards (ESRS), and to guide reporting companies. Task Force 3 focuses on sustainable operations for all sizes of publishing companies, from micro-enterprises and small and medium-sized enterprises (SMEs) to large corporations. The Working Group emphasizes the importance of being both quick (not waiting until everything is known) and nimble (flexible and agile in adjusting as more is learned).

Some research has looked at the integration of the SDGs into the Global Reporting Initiative (GRI) and factors affecting the adoption of the SDGs by organizations.

===== Carbon-neutral =====
In the case of publishing, many of the steps involved in publishing a journal or a book involve carbon or greenhouse gas emissions and are highly relevant to SDG 13 (Climate action). There are calls to combat climate change by making publishing systems carbon-neutral. In the United Kingdom, the Compact signatory The Publishers Association (PA) has launched its own "Publishing Declares" initiative. PA has also worked with RISE (Research Institutes of Sweden) and Solstice Associates to commission a carbon calculator specific to UK book and journal publishers, to enable them to monitor their carbon outputs.

Discussions of changes in institutional practice at the ALPSP University Press Redux conference in 2022 included how to create a carbon neutral supply chain, and environmental implications of business-related travel. Conferences are experimenting with remote meetings and "flipped" conferencing. IOS Publishers encourages its journals to reduce the use of print materials at conferences and trade shows. Many organizations are rethinking the necessity for in-person work and commuting. A researcher from Institution of Engineering and Technology has reported that in his department, commuting had a higher impact on carbon emissions than server usage and business flying combined.

Both Routledge and Taylor & Francis have achieved CarbonNeutral® publication certification for their print books and journals, under the Natural Capital Partners' CarbonNeutral Protocol. Steps taken included reducing some print publications in favor of digital publications, shifting to print on demand services, and purchasing third-party-verified carbon credits. In another example of a change in institutional practice in support of sustainability, Taylor & Francis have chosen to decrease environmental impact by replacing plastic with responsibly sourced paper packaging for mailing of journals. The decision was made after research into the options and a trial with the journal Brontë Studies.

Oxford University Press has found that 75% of its carbon footprint is associated with paper, print and shipping. As of 2023, Oxford University Press reported a 59% reduction in its operational carbon footprint. It reported an increase in its use of sustainably sourced paper (from 75% to 91%). Waste was reduced by 70%. with the company's two largest offices (about 40% of its workforce) achieving zero waste. In other SDG-related initiatives, OUP has increased the representation of women in leadership roles to 45%, carried out a climate risk assessment, and is working with a South African government initiative to increase literacy through its Road to Literacy campaign.

Springer Nature has reported that its offices, fleet and flights became carbon neutral as of 2020. The achievement was a result of decreasing carbon emissions, using green electricity and buying socially responsible carbon offsets. Springer Nature Group has appointed a Climate Action Officer, set short-term carbon targets and introduced compulsory sustainable business training for all employees.

Wiley also reported that it became carbon neutral as of 2020. Wiley uses renewable energy sources, purchasing energy through green tariffs, documented by Energy Attribute Certificates (EACs). Wiley is reducing the environmental impact of its print products and supporting reforestation through a Go Green fund. In a partnership with Trees for the Future, a tree is planted in Sub-Saharan Africa for each print copy Wiley stops printing. In 2021, Wiley's print volume was reduced by 1.1 million copies or 85 million pages of paper. In addition, Wiley uses paper from sustainable sources and minimizes transportation by locating print production close to delivery areas. Wiley is also recycling and reducing waste.

===== Open access =====
Another step toward SDG 12 (responsible consumption and production) and SDG 13 (climate action) is to move away from print publication to electronic publishing. Open access publishing of scientific content has been identified as an important step toward progress on SDGs.

Many new journals are born digital and open access (OA). Under models such as Diamond open access and Subscribe to Open content is made freely available and becomes accessible to countries, libraries and users who would not be able to afford fees and subscriptions. Open access is receiving strong support from librarians.

===== Discounted fees =====
Pay-per-article publishing models raise issues of regional and global equity. Through the Research4Life initiative, low-income and middle-income countries can be given free or low-cost access to peer-reviewed collections online that they would otherwise not be able to afford. In some cases, authors from designated countries may be exempted from paying author publishing fees that would otherwise be required to publish in a journal. Publishers decide which journals will participate in such programs.

The Research4Life partnership involves the World Health Organization (WHO), Food and Agriculture Organization (FAO), United Nations Environment Programme, World Intellectual Property Organization (WIPO), the International Association of Scientific, Technical and Medical Publishers (STM), Cornell University and Yale University. Research4Life includes five programmes: Hinari (biomedical and health literature), AGORA (food, agriculture, environmental science), OARE (environmental science), ARDI (science and technology), and GOALI (legal information).

==== Publications ====
===== Diversity and inclusivity =====
Diversity and inclusion are considered fundamental to achieving the Sustainable Development Goals, not only in relation to SDG 10 (Reduced Inequalities) and SDG 5 (Gender Equality), but as underlying all forms of social, economic, and political inclusion, including SDG 4 (Quality Education), SDG 8 (Decent Work and Economic Growth) and SDG 16 (Peace, Justice, and Strong Institutions). In 2020, the Royal Society of Chemistry (RSC) launched a Joint Commitment for Action on Inclusion and Diversity in Publishing, building upon previous data-driven work to document inequities in scientific culture, and in particular gender differences in the chemical sciences and the publishing process. In December 2020, it released its I&D strategy to 2025, identifying inclusive publishing as a vital part of creating "a truly inclusive community" in the chemical sciences.

"Diversity is like being asked to the party, inclusion is being asked to dance." – Bridget Tatham

Emerald Publishing has commissioned two global inclusivity reports (2020 and 2022) to assess diversity and inclusion in the academic sector. Responses from academics indicated that nearly 1/3 of academics experienced forms of discrimination and anti-inclusion, with women experiencing such behaviors at much higher rates than men. Men were more likely to say they had not experienced bullying or discrimination and were almost twice as likely to feel that inclusivity did not provide noticeable benefits. Sixty percent of responding academics said their institution had taken steps to promote inclusivity in their work environment. Ninety percent believed that greater inclusion could improve academia by promoting different ways of thinking.

Initiatives such as the Coalition for Diversity and Inclusion in Scholarly Communications (C4Disc) have developed resources such as the Toolkits for Equity Project and its "Guidelines on Inclusive Language and Images in Scholarly Communication."

===== Editorial structure =====
One example of realignment in existing institutions is the review of boards and editorial structures, with awareness of diversity and inclusion. This can address SDG 5 (gender equality) and SDG 10 (reduced inequalities). A lack of gender equity on editorial boards is a well-documented problem. There are also differences in representation and practice in publishing in terms of regions and cultural groups.

Studies of both editorial boards and the peer-review process indicate that women are underrepresented. Studies show that both men and women tend to display same-gender preference, a pattern that should be considered when rethinking editorial practices since it will likely persist once parity is achieved. Redressing gender disparity is the responsibility of gatekeeper groups at multiple levels. In medicine, these can include medical schools, healthcare organisations, medical societies, and funders as well as medical journals.

IOS Press has reviewed the distribution of its journal editors, and reports that the editorial boards it reviewed are predominantly male. IOS has issued a "Call to action" to improve gender balance. Springer Nature has increased the percentage of women who are senior leaders from 39% in 2018 to 43% in 2021.

IOS Press has also reviewed the regional balance of its journal editors and is moving to expand its editorial boards to better represent researchers from all parts of the world. Emerald Publishing has formed an Indigenous Peoples Advisory Board to improve representation, diversity and inclusion. Canadian Science Publishing has recognized the lack of indigenous peoples in peer review and publishing processes, and has taken steps to encourage co-production of knowledge in its journal Arctic Science. Co-editor-in-chief Lisa Loseto acknowledges that new processes may be needed to support indigenous participation in science.

===== Curation =====
Connecting research and practice is key to achieving the Sustainable Development Goals. One approach is for publishers to work to connect their existing content more clearly to the SDGs. Organizations such as STM are focusing on the curation and sharing of SDG-related content and providing tools to help publishers better reach audiences to increase the impact of scientific content. For example, Elsevier has organized its information into an SDG Resource Center in which content is related to the 17 SDGs. Springer Nature has published more than one million gold open access articles, and has been noted for its 17 SDG content hubs, which relate those articles to specific SDGs.

Scientific database Dimensions.ai enables filters for research into the SDGs, Elsevier has generated 5 sets of SDG mappings.

===== Creation =====
In addition, scholarly publishers are bringing together academics and policymakers to create new content. Emerald Publishing has identified "impact articles" which explicitly discuss the impact of underlying research as a particularly important type of article for publication.

There are also calls to preserve and share research data sets and publication metadata as part of the publication process. The FAIR Data Principles are a framework for making research data and metadata "findable, accessible, interoperable, and reusable."

===== Journals =====
Publishers are introducing new journals to publish research relevant to the SDGs. PLOS introduced five new open-access journals focusing on SDG-related areas in 2021: PLOS Climate, PLOS Water (SDG 6), PLOS Sustainability and Transformation, PLOS Digital Health and PLOS Global Public Health (SDG 3). PLOS joined the SDG Publishers Compact in 2023, reaffirming its commitment to "advancing the 17 Sustainable Development Goals by actively seeking and promoting scientific content related to the goals, as well as committing to sustainable actions across our business."

Oxford University Press is publishing a series of Oxford Open Journals, with titles including Oxford Open Climate Change, Oxford Open Energy (SDG 7), Oxford Open Immunology, Oxford Open Infrastructure and Health, and Oxford Open Digital Health. Cambridge University Press is releasing a set of open access journals known as Cambridge Prisms, including Coastal Futures (SDG 14), Precision Medicine, Global Mental Health, Extinction, Plastics, Water and Drylands (SDG 15). Springer Nature has launched thematic journals including Nature Climate Change, Nature Energy, Nature Sustainability, Nature Food (SDG 2), Nature Human Behaviour and Nature Water. Nature Cities (appearing 2024) will relate to SDG 11 (Sustainable cities and communities) as well as other SDGs.

Many of the new journals are transdisciplinary in nature, such as Advances in Global Health, from the University of California Press. The journal launched in 2021, is open access and is framed around the SDGs. The journal's senior editor is Fernando Mardones, from the Pontifical Catholic University of Chile.

In support of diversity and inclusion, the Lowitja Institute is working with Elsevier to launch a new international peer-reviewed online open access journal for First Nations research. First Nations Health and Wellbeing - The Lowitja Journal is expected to appear in 2023.

===== Communication skills =====
To drive progress, it is important for scientists and communicators to better prepare and present information relevant to the SDGs to a wide variety of audiences, including policymakers, practitioners, advocacy organizations, journalists, patients and other members of the general public. Signatories of the SDG Publishers Compact promote and teach techniques for better communication when presenting scientific information. The SDG Publishers Compact Fellows have worked with DORA, the Open Climate Campaign and Open Pharma to provide training and supporting materials on "How to write for non-academic audiences to achieve progress towards the UN Sustainable Development Goals (SDGs)". Many other sources, including the American Psychological Association, also discuss skills for writing for a variety of audiences.

Two important areas of skills are writing summaries in plain language and clearly highlighting practitioner or policy action points. Medical writers may write several types of specialized summaries: regulatory lay summaries, plain language summaries (PLS), and standalone plain language summaries of publications (PLSPs). Each has its own purpose and audience. The Open Pharma initiative has developed best practice recommendations for writing plain language summaries for publication in peer-reviewed medical journals.

Plain language summaries can be useful in both medical and non-medical areas of science. Taylor & Francis outline how to write a "Plain language summary" and a secondary abstract of "Key Policy Highlights" to summarize policy implications for a non-academic audience. Emerald Publishing also recommends the writing of plain language summaries, and of structured abstracts that indicate relevance and application of research.

Development of "beyond the article" communications skills such as writing policy briefs, creating podcasts to present research in an accessible format, and scientific blogging are also encouraged.

== See also ==
- Circles of Sustainability
- Global Compact on Migration
- Global Reporting Initiative
- United Nations Global Compact
- Manifesto for a Global Economic Ethic
- Corporate social responsibility
- Sustainable development
