= RMIT Global Cities Research Institute =

The RMIT Global Cities Research Institute was a major research institute of RMIT University. It was formed in 2006 as one of the four flagship research bodies at the university crossing all the disciplines from the humanities and social sciences to applied science and engineering. It has 200 staff, affiliated with seven programs.

1. Global Climate Change
  Research leader: Darryn McEvoy
2. Globalization and Culture
  Research leaders: Formerly Manfred Steger and Chris Hudson
3. Community Sustainability
  Research leaders: Supriya Singh and Yaso Nadarajah
4. Sustainable Urban and Regional Futures
  Research leaders: Ralph Horne and John Fien
5. Human Security and Disasters
  Research Leaders: John Handmer and Jeff Lewis
6. Urban Decision-Making and Complex Systems
  Research Leader: Lin Padgham
7. Global Indigeneity and Reconciliation
  Research Leader: Barry Judd

The Institute's founding Director was Paul James (2006–2013).

== Context ==
The research of the Global Cities Institute Cities begins with the proposition that cities are the crucible of contemporary human living. Cities are reframing the way in which people live on this planet. The research of the institute encompasses questions of globalization, cultural change and community sustainability, human security, and urban restructuring under pressure.

Over the last decade, billions of dollars have been spent on development and security projects by both government and non-government agencies. Despite this investment, many communities continue to live under enormous pressure. Understanding this set of problems is central to the research agenda of the Global Cities Institute. It has implications for basic questions of sustainability. For the Global Cities Institute, developing a thorough on-going research program entails going beyond identifying the immediate threats to cities and communities to explore pathways towards enhancing sustainability, security, resilience and adaptation.

The Institute has partnerships with many other programs. The Institute is engaged with the City of Melbourne on a series of projects, including the Future Melbourne project. It has global collaborations with the UN Global Compact, UN-HABITAT, Metropolis, and other institutes and centres across the world. Through the work of the Global Cities Institute, RMIT was named in 2008 as the first UN Habitat university in the Asia-Pacific region. From 2007 the Institute has hosted the United Nations Global Compact Cities Programme, the only International Secretariat of the United Nations in the Asia-Pacific region.

== Approach ==
The Global Cities Institute uses an overall approach called Engaged theory which integrates the broad range of methods and tools that different researchers in the Institute draw upon across different disciplines. At the empirical level this approach begins with a tool box for social mapping, organised around four domains of the social: economics, ecology, politics and culture (see Circles of Sustainability). At the most abstract level it engages in research into the way in which such social life is affected by slow changes in the nature of time, space and embodiment.
