= Debra Rowe =

American academic and sustainability advocate

- Alma mater: Yale University; University of Michigan
- Employer: Oakland Community College

Debra Rowe is known nationally and internationally for her work in education and sustainability. Through her work, she encourages people to create systems changes that can support a more sustainable future. At the national level, Rowe is the President of the U.S. Partnership for Education for Sustainable Development. In the education sector, she focuses on the role of educational institutions in preparing a workforce capable of supporting the development of a green economy and meeting sustainability goals. She also mentors groups such as Change the Chamber*Lobby for Climate, encouraging people to develop the skills to support and advocate for a sustainable future. Rowe has worked as a consultant with both the U.S. Department of Education and the U.S. Department of Energy.

Internationally, Rowe works with the Higher Education Sustainability Initiative (HESI). HESI is an open partnership between ten United Nations entities and the higher education community. Rowe co-chairs HESI's Education for Green Jobs action group and its SDG Publishers Compact Fellows. Rowe also works with the Clean Energy Ministerial (CEM), an international partnership that supports clean energy policy and technology. Through its Empowering People Initiative, Rowe works with governments, educators and employers to encourage the adoption of clean energy technologies and the development of a workforce with relevant education and skills.

Previously, Rowe was the Director of the Sustainability Education and Economic Development Center at the National Council for Workforce Education (NCWE). Rowe has also worked with the United Nations Youth Education Alliance (UNEP-YEA) and its Green Jobs Initiative.

Rowe edited the two-volume encyclopedia Achieving Sustainability: Visions, Principles, and Practices (2014). She has co-authored reports, guidelines, and toolkits for use by governments, educators, employers and others, including Global Guidance for Education on Green Jobs (2021), the National Roundtable on the Workforce for a Green and Inclusive Economy (2021), Clean Energy Economy & Workforce Preparation (2023) and The Recruitment Toolkit (2024).

Rowe was a professor for forty-two years at Oakland Community College in Oakland County, Michigan where she taught classes in energy management, renewable energy, sustainable development and psychology.

== Early life and education ==
Rowe attended Yale University, receiving her B.A. (1977), before going to the University of Michigan, from which she earned an M.B.A. in business (1988), an M.A. in psychology (1989), and a Ph.D. in business (1991).

== Career ==
Rowe co-designed and taught Campus and Corporate Sustainability at the University of Vermont while also teaching at the Oakland Community College (OCC) in Oakland County, Michigan. At OCC she taught classes in renewable energies, energy management and psychology. She was a professor at OCC for 42 years, until her retirement in 2023. She was active in a wide range of strategic and curriculum planning activities as well as teaching.

In addition to addressing energy management, renewable energy and sustainability issues, Rowe has focused on the role of higher education in educating people about sustainability and in creating a workforce that can support a green economy and meet sustainability goals. As a consultant for the national Partnership for Environmental Technology Education (PETE), with funding from the U.S. Department of Energy, Rowe created a model for an energy management degree, designed for use in community and technical colleges. Rowe also edited the encyclopedia Achieving Sustainability: Vision, Principles and Practices (2014).

Rowe has been described as "a mover and shaker in the field of sustainability in higher education, and a consummate connector." She is the President of the U.S. Partnership for Education for Sustainable Development, based in Washington, DC and serves on the advisory council of the Association for the Advancement of Sustainability in Higher Education (AASHE). In her work in the education sector, she focuses on the role of technical programs, schools, community colleges, universities and other higher education institutions as leaders in educating a population and a workforce that can support the development of a green economy and meet sustainability goals.

Rowe has co-founded related networks of organizations including the Higher Education Associations Sustainability Consortium (HEASC, 2005) and the Disciplinary Associations Network for Sustainability (DANS, 2006)

Through the US Partnership for Education for Sustainable Development, Rowe mentors Change the Chamber*Lobby for Climate, a “nonpartisan coalition of young adults, 100+ student groups, and other allied organizations”. The youth network creates materials and educates people on how to support environmental and social well-being and advocate for a sustainable future. Its mission is to “educate for science-based climate action... pursue meaningful change towards an equitable, sustainable future, and empower others to do the same."

Rowe has also been the Director of the Sustainability Education and Economic Development Center at the National Council for Workforce Education (NCWE), a council affiliated with the American Association of Community Colleges (AACC). There she co-created the National Clean Energy Workforce Alliance. Rowe chaired the Technical Advisory Group for the national Sustainability Education & Economic Development (SEED) Center, originally created by the AACC and later managed by the NCWE. She co-authored the National Roundtable on the Workforce for a Green and Inclusive Economy: Recommendations to the White House and Federal Agency Staff (2021). She has served as the AACC's designate to the World Federation of Colleges and Polytechnics.

Internationally, Debra Rowe co-chairs the Education for Green Jobs action group for the Higher Education Sustainability Initiative (HESI). HESI is an open partnership between United Nations entities and the higher education community. UN partners in the initiative include UN DESA, UNESCO, the UN Global Compact’s Principles for Responsible Management Education initiative, and the United Nations Academic Impact initiative, among others. Rowe has worked with the UN Youth Education Alliance (UNEP-YEA) on its Green Jobs Initiative, and is a co-author with Mari Nishimura of Global Guidance for Education on Green Jobs (2021).

Rowe also works for the Clean Energy Ministerial’s Empowering People Initiative (EPI) which organized a series of virtual cross-sector Solutions Summits for governmental policy and program staff, educators and clean energy employers. With participants from over 90 countries, the initiative encouraged the acceleration of the adoption of clean energy technologies and workforce development policies for an inclusive clean energy transition. Rowe facilitated EPI's project for Integrated Policymaking and Empowering Communications for the Clean Energy Economy and Workforce (IPEC) and authored the Clean Energy Economy & Workforce Preparation (2023) toolkit.

Rowe also co-chairs HESI's SDG Publishers Compact Fellows, an action group that develops tools, strategies, initiatives and recommended actions for connecting practitioners, policymakers, researchers, educators, students and the public, and helping communities to address challenges related to the United Nations sustainable development goals.

As a consultant, Rowe has worked with the U.S. Department of Education to develop a project on how “Sustainability Improves Students Learning”. She works with higher education organizations, teachers and students to integrate sustainability through both professional and program development. One initiative provides curricula and other resources relating to the solar, wind, green building, energy efficiency and sustainability education sectors, through the AACC's SEED Center. Other projects have been developed to connect those teaching, learning and working in the field. "Projects That Matter" is a free nonprofit website for connecting people with projects and activities. "Beyond Doom and Gloom: Engage in Climate Solutions" works to increase engagement and advocacy.

Rowe has also worked with the U.S. Department of Energy’s Pacific Northwest National Laboratory as a consultant. One project connects textbook publishers with open-source resources about technologies such as decarbonization to encourage their adoption in textbooks. Another project created a toolkit for recruiting students to enter trades involving energy efficiency, renewable energy, building electrification and decarbonization, areas with a significant shortage of trained workers.

== Selected publications ==
- Rowe, Debra, ed. (2014). Achieving Sustainability: Visions, Principles, and Practices. Detroit: Macmillan Reference USA. ISBN 9780028662046.
- Nishimura, Mari; Rowe, Debra (2021). Global Guidance for Education on Green Jobs: Connecting Higher Education and Green Opportunities for Planetary Health. United Nations Environment Programme.
- Rowe, Debra; Nicholson, Amber; Leland, Hannah (2021). "National Roundtable on the Workforce for a Green & Inclusive Economy: Recommendations to the White House and Federal Agency Staff" (PDF). The SEED Center.
- Rowe, Debra (2023). Clean Energy Economy & Workforce Preparation (PDF). Clean Energy Ministerial (CEM) Empowering People Initiative.
- Carey, Kelly; Rowe, Debra; Son, Angela N.; Hill, Sarah (2024). The Recruitment Toolkit: Recruiting Employees and Students for Residential Building Energy Efficiency & Heat Pumps (PDF). Building Performance Institute; US Partnership for Education for Sustainable Development.

== Awards and honors ==
External videos
- Education Leadership Award: Debra Rowe, C3E Women in Clean Energy Symposium, 2014

- 2014, Education Award Winner, Clean Energy Education & Empowerment (C3E) Initiative, coordinated by the International Energy Agency (IEA).
- 1990, Association of Energy Engineers Award
