= Paul James (academic) =

Australian academic

Paul James (born May 8, 1958) is a Professor Emeritus of Globalization and Cultural Diversity at Western Sydney University, and the former Director of the Institute for Culture and Society where he worked since 2014. He is a writer on global politics, globalization, sustainability, and social theory.

== Background ==
After studying politics at the University of Melbourne James was a lecturer in the Department of Politics at Monash University, Melbourne before moving to Royal Melbourne Institute of Technology in 2002 as Professor of Globalization and Cultural Diversity, the first professor of globalization in Australia. At RMIT he led and secured funding for several successful initiatives, including the Global Cities Institute (Director, 2006–2013); the UN Global Compact Cities Programme (Director, 2007–2014); and the Globalism Institute (Founding Director, 2002–2007; now, the Centre for Global Research) that brought scholars including Tom Nairn, Manfred Steger, Heikki Patomäki and Nevzat Soguk to RMIT.

He was appointed as Director of the Institute for Culture and Society at Western Sydney University in 2014.

He was Director of the United Nations Global Compact Cities Programme, a UN International Secretariat with offices in Sydney, Melbourne and New York until 2014.

== Contributions ==
James is primarily known as a theorist of globalization, particularly how local and national communities alter under an emergent level of global integration. His work has been read as challenging the simple notion of 'global flows' presented by other writers such Zygmunt Bauman. Using a distinctive comparative method called 'constitutive abstraction' or 'engaged theory', he has contributed to theories of political culture, the changing nature of community, and the structures and subjectivities of social formation. He is author or editor of more than 30 books, including a SAGE Publications series on globalization. The series, Central Currents in Globalization, is a collection of writings by key figures in the field of globalization. His collaborative work includes writing with other senior scholars such as Jonathan Friedman, Peter Mandaville, Tom Nairn, Heikki Patomäki, Manfred Steger and Christopher Wise, amongst others. His main contribution in the field of global studies is the book Globalism, Nationalism, Tribalism.

He co-edited Arena Journal (from 1986), a publication concerned with understanding the crisis-ridden transformations of our time, and is on the board of a dozen other journals.

His work also contributes empirically to understanding contemporary politics and culture, particularly in Australia, East Timor, and Papua New Guinea. His research on sustainable community development laid part of the foundation for the 2007 legislation that went through the PNG parliament, and was developed by the Minister for Community Development at the time, Dame Carol Kidu, as the basis of community development policy in Papua New Guinea.

As Director of the UN Global Compact Cities Programme (2007-2014), James also worked in the cross-over fields of urban sustainability and sustainable development. He argues against the mainstream view that 'smart cities' are necessarily better or more sustainable cities, suggesting instead that it is the integration of learning and practice which makes for intelligent and sustainable cities. Along these lines he is quoted as saying that London used the 2012 Olympics in an intelligent way 'where the economy, politics and culture thrive, aided by good transport and a strong information technology infrastructure, all built on a platform of ecological sustainability'.

Consistent with this approach, he is one of the key developers of the 'Circles of Sustainability' method used by a number of cities around the world to respond to relatively intractable or complex issues. That method takes the emphasis away from economic growth and suggests that cities should rather be aiming for social sustainability, including cultural resilience, political vibrancy, economic prosperity and ecological adaptation. Here his key contribution is Urban Sustainability in Theory and Practice: Circles of Sustainability.

As Research Director of Global Reconciliation (2009–), an organization dedicated to global dialogue and community-level practice, he has (with Paul Komesaroff) contributed to redefining the concept of 'reconciliation'. Instead of an emphasis on reconciliation as an event of testimony and contrition, the Global Reconciliation Foundation treats reconciliation as an ongoing process of dialogue and practice across the boundaries of continuing difference. In 2002, James, Komesaroff, and a management team led by Peter Phipps and Haris Halilovich, ran the first national reconciliation forum in Bosnia Hercegovina. In October 2012, James, Komesaroff and Suresh Sudram, together with a team in Australia and Sri Lanka ran the first national civil-society reconciliation forum in Sri Lanka since the end of the war. This followed a Reconciliation Summit on the Middle East held in Amman, Jordan in 2009, organized by Komesaroff and James.

Because his work has a general reach, criticisms of James’ work tend to take the form of rebukes for what he does not do or challenges to take seriously mainstream considerations such as citizenship and social movement success. For example, describing James's book written with Tom Nairn, Global Matrix, Claudia Aradau (2007, p. 371) initially writes positively that: “Contradiction remains however the structuring principle of the book and a method of analysis. It allows the authors to think alternatives from ‘the field of our own ideological determinations’ (Balibar, 2004, p. 25)". However, she then goes on to criticize the authors for failing to consider citizenship as one of the missing conceptions in the range of alternatives to the world in crisis that the authors describe.

In a similar vein, Bihku Parekh says that despite his comprehensive coverage, "James does not explore how the nation and the state are internally related such that the apparently strange idea of the nation-state was considered self-evident by many."

== Recognition ==
- Fellow of the Royal Society of the Arts (2010–present)
- Melbourne Ambassador (2010–present)
- Collaborating Advisor to the Minister for Community Development of Papua New Guinea (2004-2010); including contributing to drafting the Minister's New Policy Document (2004) and the Corporate Plan (2004-2007)
- Bronze Medal, ‘Beyond the Frontiers of Knowledge’, awarded to the Community Sustainability International Project, Malaysia, by the University of Malaya (2005)
- Member of the G20 Advisory Group to the Canadian Prime Minister (2004)
- Crisp Medal by the Australasian Political Studies Association for the best book in the field of political studies (1996)
- Australian Research Council Fellowship (1994-1996)
- Japan-Australia Foundation Fellowship (1991)
