= Arena (publishing co-operative) =

Australian publishing co-operative

Arena is an independent Australian critical and radical publishing cooperative that has been continuously producing writings since its founding in 1963. Established by figures in Australia’s ‘New Left’, Arena is a forum to debate and develop new ideas about society and the world. Arena is especially interested in how people and communities draw on complex cultural histories and life-ways that may defy the logic of late capitalism, and on which basis the social might be understood anew.

Though the quarterly Arena commenced as a New Left magazine with a commitment to extending Marxist approaches by developing an account of intellectual practices, its subsequent debates and theoretical work, and engagements with critical theory, media theory, post-structuralism and postmodernism, have led it to develop an approach known as the 'constitutive abstraction' approach. This is connected to an associated lineage of engaged theory. All of these are underpinned by a preoccupation with the questions of social abstraction, including the abstraction of intellectual practices. They include a special emphasis on the cultural and social contradictions of globalised hi-tech society, which the Arena editors took to be misrepresented within prevailing media theory and post-structuralism.

Many of the themes the Arena group has explored over the decades relate to those raised by writers like Slavoj Žižek, Zygmunt Bauman and Richard Sennett, and, to some degree, writers associated with the Frankfurt School. However, Arena's critique also suggests that many of these authors stop short of a full critique of the ungrounding of contemporary social life by current global/ technological/ media processes.

== History ==
The quarterly journal Arena was founded in Melbourne, Australia in 1963, at a time of crisis for the Old Left and the emergence of the New Left. Although the publication covered a wide variety of topics, one was of key practical and theoretical importance: the transformation of post-World War II industrial society by the mobilisation of knowledge production as a core productive activity, the nature of intellectual practice, and the consequent creation of new class and cultural divisions whose social character made necessary a thorough revision of the classical Marxist theory of class and base and superstructure accounts of the social whole.

A key to this theoretical trend was extended commentary on the transformation of the modern university, the instrumentalisation of education, and the revolt against this that formed the core of many of the social upheavals of the 1960s and beyond, as was a focus on colonialism in the Asia-Pacific region, including relations between Australia and its then colony Papua New Guinea, and between Indigenous and non-Indigenous Australians.

== The 1970s: critique of social democracy and the development of a post-Marxist framework ==
By the mid-1970s – as the radical Left faltered and social democracy became increasingly instrumentalised – Arena contributors were focusing on the degree to which social life could be seen not through a base/superstructure/ideology model, but as nested levels of material abstraction, from the least abstract – face-to-face daily life – to the most abstract, such as global commodity and image/media circulation. A focus on material abstraction had its origins in a redirection of the implications of both the critique of technology by figures like Jacques Ellul and the extension of its range by Marshall McLuhan. Marx's analysis of the commodity, particularly as reconstructed by Alfred Sohn-Rethel, consolidated that movement.

The dominant social contradiction was seen as no longer between labour and capital, but between deep-seated human cultural needs grounded in the less abstract levels of life and the drawing of ever-larger areas of life into the most abstracted, and instrumentalised levels of life. Contemporary life was held to be based on a widespread erroneous assumption that the elements of social life – identity stability, meaning, co-operative solidarity – could be 'taken-for-granted' and would survive intact through any process of technological development.

A re-radicalised emancipatory Left would thus be one in which society had a reflexive relationship to different levels of abstraction, maintaining all in a dynamic relationship – crucial to which was an overcoming of the split between intellectual and manual labour as separate class and culturally grounded activities. Although this approach took up some of the themes of the counter-culture, it was also critical of the counter-culture's excessive valorisation of less abstract levels of life and the belief that modern subjects could or should withdraw into anti-technological primitivism. In Arena's immediate circles it found expression in a decision to establish Arena’s own printery and, from 1974 onwards, to typeset, print and publish their own journal and related publications.

Arena's distinctive approach can thus be seen as having some superficial similarities with post-Marxist and post-classical attempts to apply a levels analysis of social life as developed (differently) by Jürgen Habermas and Louis Althusser. Its critical account of instrumentalised abstraction also has some surface parallels with Slavoj Žižek's critique of postmodernism in The Ticklish Subject and The Fragile Absolute, and Zygmunt Bauman's analysis of 'liquid modernity’ in his recent works. More generally, Arena’s distinctive approach is grounded in an emphasis on the constitutive role of abstraction both within the interpretive and the instrumental expression of rationality.

Though it continued to publish a great deal of conventional radical-left political economic and geopolitical material, it was at this point that its orientation began to diverge from other Australian left publications such as Overland, and the Australian Left Review.

== The 1980s: post-structuralism, biotechnology and exterminism ==
This practical-theoretical approach led those associated with Arena into a number of key debates and causes of the 1980s. The renewal of a 'hot' Cold War by the Reagan administration and of the nuclear arms race – 'exterminism' in E. P. Thompson's phrase – was analysed as an over-determined consequence of an instrumentalised, maximally abstracted way of life. Advances in medical research such as in-vitro fertilisation were given a more critical account, examining the manner in which such technologies were harbingers of a wider cultural contradiction arising from the reconstruction of nature at the molecular biological level.

The newly popular work of postmodernists and post-structuralists like Jean Baudrillard and Jacques Derrida, which argued the simulated and deferred nature of the sign and text, was critically analysed as, in fact, a description of a highly abstracted media society, falsely generalised and transhistoricised.

These and other debates increasingly put the Arena editors in a critical relationship to what remained of the Left, which had enthusiastically embraced the celebration of difference and hybridity as the post-structuralist revolution swept English-speaking humanities departments in the 1980s. Paradoxically, this also led to some on the Left failing to grasp Arena’s standpoint, representing it, too, as an expression of the post-structuralist wave.

Increasingly, Arena’s arguments added up to a critique that was deep-cultural and/or ontological. As the USSR collapsed and capitalism was fully globalised, and as the environmental problem became compelling, it was becoming clear that a global system had developed to such a degree that its basic contradiction was of the possibility of meaningful life itself.

== Arena Magazine and Arena Journal ==
By the end of the 1980s it was becoming increasingly difficult to bridge the deeper theoretical debates and more current analysis within one publication. Arena (quarterly) was concluded at issue 99/100 in 1992 and two new publications launched – the popular political and cultural commentary publication Arena Magazine (6 times per year) and the twice-yearly theoretical, academically refereed publication, Arena Journal.

Drawing on a wide variety of writers, and acting as a more pluralist space for debates within critical streams of Australian thought and politics, Arena's editors took part in most of the key debates in Australian political and cultural life over the last fifteen years. These found their most directly engaged expression in the Magazine; they included an extended consideration of the relations between Indigenous and non-Indigenous Australia, and the challenges faced by traditional Indigenous communities within a modern framework; the importation and development of the 'culture wars' and the rise of right-wing populism as a response to the 'ungrounding' of social life under globalisation; the contradictions arising from the spread of post-human and post-natural technologies, from birth technologies to medication to GM foods; the rise of 'military humanitarianism' in the NATO Balkans interventions in the 1990s and its continuation and expansion in Iraq; and in the 'mandatory detention' regime imposed on refugees in the 2000s. Importantly, many of these debates problematised elements of progressive/radical discourse, for example, the nature of instrumental policies like multiculturalism, the 'no-borders' approach to refugee issues, or unreflective techno-utopianism that rose with the internet and spread of post-human technologies.

In more recent years the Arena editors were particularly concerned to position the environmental movement within a general critique of the neo-liberal trajectory. Arena Journal especially, with its more direct focus on a range of theoretical-practical concerns, sought to develop the more fundamental aspects of the Arena critique. Its brief is to promote ethically and theoretically concerned discussion about the prospects for cooperative life through a central focus on the reconstruction of class relations, forms of selfhood and community life in contemporary society. It published scholarly works by Australian and international scholars.

Arena Journal ceased publication in 2020, and Arena Magazine in 2019.

== Arena Online and Arena Quarterly ==
Arena Online is a short-form online resource. The longer-form Arena Quarterly is available 4 times a year and appears in digital and printed form.

== Contributors ==
Much of the initial theoretical framework for Arena's editorial approach was developed by founding editor Geoff Sharp, with editors Nonie Sharp and Doug White. Key contributions on theoretical frameworks for analysing education, post-structuralism, feminism, nationalism, technology and subjectivity have been made by John Hinkson, Gerry Gill, Alison Caddick, Paul James, Simon Cooper and Guy Rundle.

Since the late 1960s the publications have been produced by a group of around a dozen to twenty members, many of whom have been part of the project for several decades.

Over the years Arena's publications have featured work from a wide range of Australian and international contributors, including Dennis Altman, Judith Brett, Humphrey McQueen, Don Watson, John Pilger, Julie Stephens, Boris Frankel, Susan Hawthorne, Noam Chomsky, David Holmes, Verity Burgmann, Andrew Milner, Terry Eagleton, Fredric Jameson, Tom Nairn, Larissa Behrendt, Jürgen Habermas, Zygmunt Bauman, Christos Tsiolkas, Kevin Hart, Simon During, Noel Pearson, Raimond Gaita, John Frow, Naomi Klein, and Albert Langer.

== Pamphlets and papers ==
Arena has also published a range of monographs, pamphlets and papers over the years on topics ranging from nuclear power and critical Australian political economy to the Iraq occupation.

== Printing ==
The Arena co-operative printed their own publications from 1974 to 1992, and continued to run a commercial printery with a specific focus on community and alternative publications, in Fitzroy, Melbourne until its closure in 2020.

== Books ==
Since 1982, has published books on a variety of topics, from social theory, to Indigenous and colonial Australian history, and Asia-Pacific studies. Arena published the widely read Coercive Reconciliation, a collection of critical essays in response to the conservative Australia Government's 2007 intervention in Indigenous communities in the Northern Territory. More recently it published Being Arab: Arabism and the Politics of Identity.
