= Bioscience Horizons =

- Discipline: Life sciences
- Language: English

Publication details
- History: 2008-2018
- Publisher: UCL Press (United Kingdom)
- Open access: Yes

Standard abbreviations
- ISO 4: Biosci. Horiz.

Indexing
- CODEN: BHIOA8
- ISSN: 1754-7431
- OCLC no.: 214113393

Links
- Journal homepage; Online access; Online archive

Bioscience Horizons is an online scientific journal which publishes bioscience research. The journal has two aims: a) to publish high-quality research from students, both undergraduate and Masters. b) to enable student authors to directly experience the process of academic publication, as corresponding authors. In 2014, the journal went international, attracting high-quality manuscript submissions from all over the world. Academic reviewers, who are experts in their fields, assess manuscripts as rigorously as they would for other journals. Bioscience Horizons is published by a consortium of UK universities in partnership with Oxford University Press and was established in 2008. The journal ceased publication at the end of 2018.

== Consortium ==
The consortium of universities that manages Bioscience Horizons are the universities of Nottingham, Leeds, Reading, Bath, Birmingham and Chester.

== Awards ==
In 2008, Bioscience Horizons received an award for publishing innovation and received a Highly Commended certificate from the Association of Learned and Professional Society Publishers.
