= Engaged theory =

Comprehensive critical theory

Engaged theory is a methodological framework for understanding the social complexity of a society, by using social relations as the base category of study, with the social always understood as grounded in the natural, including people as embodied beings. Engaged theory progresses from detailed, empirical analysis of the people, things, and processes of the world to abstract theory about the constitution and social framing of people, things, and processes.

As a type of critical theory, engaged theory is cross-disciplinary, drawing from sociology, anthropology, and political studies, history, philosophy, and global studies to engage with the world whilst seeking to change the world. Examples of engaged theory are the constitutive abstraction approach of writers, such as John Hinkson, Geoff Sharp, and Simon Cooper, who published in Arena Journal; and the approach developed at the Centre for Global Research of the Royal Melbourne Institute of Technology, Australia by scholars such as Manfred Steger, Paul James and Damian Grenfell, who draw from the works of Pierre Bourdieu, Benedict Anderson, and Charles Taylor, et al.

== Politics of engagement ==
Engaged theory research is in the world and of the world, whereby a theory somehow affects what occurs in the world, but engaged theory does not always include itself into a theory about the constitution of ideas and practices, which the sociologist Anthony Giddens identifies as a double hermeneutic movement. Engaged theory is explicit about its political standpoint, thus, in Species Matters: Human Advocacy and Cultural Theory, Carol J. Adams explained that: “Engaged theory ... arises from anger about what is, theory that envisions what is possible. Engaged theory makes change possible.” Moreover, in the praxis of engaged theory, theoreticians must be aware of their own tendencies to be ideologically driven by the dominant concerns of the time in which the theory is presented; for example, the ideology of Liberalism is reductive in its advocacy of and for 'freedom', fails to reflect upon the influence of the ideology of the liberal advocate.

== Grounding of analysis ==
All social theories are dependent upon a process of abstraction. This is what philosophers call epistemological abstraction. However, they do not characteristically theorize their own bases for establishing their standpoint. Engaged theory does. By comparison, grounded theory, a very different approach, suggests that empirical data collection is a neutral process that gives rise to theoretical claims out of that data. Engaged theory, to the contrary, treats such a claim to value neutrality as naively unsustainable. Engaged theory is thus reflexive in a number of ways:

- Firstly, it recognises that doing something as basic as collecting data already entails making theoretical presuppositions.
- Secondly, it names the levels of analysis from which theoretical claims are made. Engaged theory works across four levels of theoretical abstraction. (See below: § Modes of analysis.)
- Thirdly, it makes a clear distinction between theory and method, suggesting that a social theory is an argument about a social phenomenon, while an analytical method or set of methods is defined a means of substantiating that theory. Engaged theory in these terms works as a 'Grand method', but not a 'grand theory'. It provides an integrated set of methodological tools for developing different theories of things and processes in the world.
- Fourthly, it seeks to understand both its own epistemological basis, while treating knowledge formation as one of the basic ontological categories of human practice.
- Fifthly, it treats history as a modern way of understanding temporal change; and therefore different ontologically from a tribal saga or cosmological narrative. In other words, it provides meta-standpoint on its own capacity to historicize.

== Modes of analysis ==
In the version of Engaged theory developed by an Australian-based group of writers, analysis moves from the most concrete form of analysis—empirical generalization—to more abstract modes of analysis. Each subsequent mode of analysis is more abstract than the previous one moving across the following themes: 1. doing, 2. acting, 3. relating, 4. being.

This leads to the 'levels' approach as set out below:

=== 1. Empirical analysis (ways of doing) ===
The method begins by emphasizing the importance of a first-order abstraction, here called empirical analysis. It entails drawing out and generalizing from on-the-ground detailed descriptions of history and place. This first level involves generating empirical description based on observation, experience, recording or experiment—in other words, abstracting evidence from that which exists or occurs in the world—or it involves drawing upon the empirical research of others. The first level of analytical abstraction is an ordering of ‘things in the world’, in a way that does not depend upon any kind of further analysis being applied to those ‘things’.

For example, the Circles of Sustainability approach is a form of engaged theory distinguishing (at the level of empirical generalization) between different domains of social life. It can be used for understanding and assessing the quality of life. Although that approach is also analytically defended through more abstract theory, the claim that economics, ecology, politics and culture can be distinguished as central domains of social practice has to be defensible at an empirical level. It needs to be useful in analysing situations on the ground.

The success or otherwise of the method can be assessed by examining how it is used. One example of use of the method was a project on Papua New Guinea called Sustainable Communities, Sustainable Development.

=== 2. Conjunctural analysis (ways of acting) ===
This second level of analysis, conjunctural analysis, involves identifying and, more importantly, examining the intersection (the conjunctures) of various patterns of action (practice and meaning). Here the method draws upon established sociological, anthropological and political categories of analysis such as production, exchange, communication, organization and inquiry.

=== 3. Integrational analysis (ways of relating) ===
This third level of entry into discussing the complexity of social relations examines the intersecting modes of social integration and differentiation. These modes of integration are described here as different ways of relating to others and distinguishing oneself—from face-to-face interactions to disembodied forms of connection. Here we see a break with the dominant emphases of classical social theory and a movement towards a post-classical sensibility. In relation to the nation-state, for example, we can ask how it is possible to explain a phenomenon that, at least in its modern variant, subjectively explains itself by reference to face-to-face metaphors of blood and place—ties of genealogy, kinship and ethnicity—when the objective 'reality' of all nation-states is that they are disembodied communities of abstracted strangers who will never meet. This accords with Benedict Anderson's conception of 'imagined communities', but recognizes the contradictory formation of that kind of community.

=== 4. Categorical analysis (ways of being) ===
This level of enquiry is based on an exploration of ontological categories (i.e., categories of being such as time and space). If the previous form of analysis emphasizes the different modes through which people live their commonalities with or differences from others, those same themes are examined through more abstract analytical lenses of different grounding forms of life: respectively, embodiment, spatiality, temporality, performativity and epistemology. At this level, generalizations can be made about the dominant modes of categorization in a social formation or in its fields of practice and discourse. It is only at this level that it makes sense to generalize across modes of being and to speak of ontological formations—societies formed through the uneven dominance of formations such as tribalism, traditionalism, modernism or postmodernism.

== See also ==
- Anthropology – Scientific study of humans, human behavior, and societies
- Antipositivism – Theoretical stance in social science
- Arena (Australian publishing co-operative) – Australian publishing co-operative
- Critical animal studies – Interdisciplinary field and community
- Critical theory – Approach to social philosophy
- Epistemology – Philosophical study of knowledge
- Grounded theory – Qualitative research methodology
- Ontology – Philosophical study of being
- Post-Marxism – Trend in political philosophy and social theory
- Quality of life – Degree of individual well-being
- Social change – Any significant alteration in societal order
- Sociology – Scientific study of human society and relationships
