= Communist Review =

Australian magazine (1934–1966)

Communist Review July 1941

The Communist Review is a defunct Australian magazine that was published in varying frequencies and formats from 1934 to 1966, in Sydney, New South Wales, Australia.

== History ==
The Communist Review was launched on 13 March 1934, as the official organ of the Communist Party of Australia. The magazine was published continuously through 1966. However, it appeared in a variety of sizes and formats, and several editions during 1941 were issued as typescript duplicates. When the Communist Party of Australia was made illegal in 1951 by the government of Robert Menzies, publication of the magazine continued unabated. The Communist Review eventually ceased after it was replaced by the Australian Left Review, which at the time was considered to have a broader political agenda.

== Digitisation ==
The various editions of the paper have been digitised as part of the Australian Newspapers Digitisation Program, a project hosted by the National Library of Australia.

== See also ==
- List of magazines in Australia
