= International Association of Scientific, Technical, and Medical Publishers =

Logo of the International Association of Scientific, Technical, and Medical Publishers

The International Association of Scientific, Technical, and Medical Publishers, known for short by the initials for the last part of its name, STM, is an international trade association organised and run for the benefit of scholarly, scientific, technical, medical, and professional publishers. It was conceived as the STM Group at the Frankfurt Book Fair of 1969 following discussions at the 1968 meeting of the International Publishers Association. It obtained its current name and was registered in Amsterdam as a foundation in 1994.

The association currently has two offices, located in the Hague and Oxford. As of 2024, it had over 140 members in 21 countries who publish more than 60% of the annually published journal literature and tens of thousands of monographs and reference works. Its chief executive officer, Ian Moss, joined the organization in 2019, following the retirement of predecessor Michael Mabe (CEO 2006–2019). STM announced on 16 November 2021 that its Board has appointed Caroline Sutton as the organization’s new Chief Executive Officer. Sutton, who previously served as Director of Open Research for Taylor & Francis, started the position in February 2022.

STM is an inaugural signatory of the United Nations SDG Publishers Compact and has taken steps to support the achievement of the Sustainable Development Goals (SDGs) in the publishing industry. These include officially endorsing action suggestions from the SDG Publishers Compact Fellows and establishing the SDGs Academic Publishers Forum in 2022 to provide information and support to STM members.
