= Nairn-Anderson thesis =

The Nairn-Anderson thesis is a theory of British economic and political decline developed in the 1960s and 1970s by political theorist Tom Nairn and historian Perry Anderson.

The thesis suggests that Britain's early development into a capitalist society was so successful that it failed to overturn archaic social structures and institutions like the power of the aristocracy. By contrast, continental European states like Germany introduced efficient administrations and educational systems as part of a "second" bourgeois revolution. The result for Britain, wrote Anderson, is that "the triumphs of the past become the bane of the present."

The thesis was first developed in a series of essays in New Left Review and is cited today in discussions of Britain's post-Imperial decline and "dysfunctional" institutions.

== Criticism ==
The thesis has been criticized by historian E.P. Thompson. He said the pair's failure to mention the influence of communism on the UK left is an "astounding lacuna," and that the thesis is overly reductionist. "There is a stridency in the way our authors hammer at class and tidy up cultural phenomena into class categories, as well as a ruthlessness in their dismissal of the English experience, which stirs uneasy memories," wrote Thompson in a 1965 essay "The Peculiarities of the English."
