= Australian Left Review =

Australian Left Review was a monthly journal of the Communist Party of Australia (CPA) from 1966 to 1993. It was one of a number of left political journals founded in Australia in the post-war years, including Overland and Arena (first series).

== History and profile ==
Australian Left Review was the successor to the earlier CPA journal Communist Review, which published between 1934 and 1966. The headquarters of the journal was in Sydney. The journal was also published on a bi-monthly basis. In 1992, the publication briefly changed its name to ALR Magazine before ceasing publication altogether.
