= Tom Nairn =

Scottish political theorist (1932–2023)

- Born: 2 June 1932; Freuchie, Fife, Scotland
- Died: 21 January 2023 (aged 90)
- Children: 2

Academic background
- Education: Edinburgh College of Art; University of Edinburgh (MA)

Academic work
- Discipline: Political science, political economy
- School or tradition: New Left
- Institutions: Durham University; RMIT University; University of Edinburgh

Thomas Cunningham Nairn (2 June 1932 – 21 January 2023) was a Scottish political theorist and academic. He was an Honorary Research Fellow in the School of Government and International Affairs at Durham University. He was known as an essayist and a supporter of Scottish independence.

Nairn was Scotland’s prominent political philosopher of modern times. His most famous book is The Break up of Britain (1977). Nairn writes that nationalism is both good and bad. He says that Scotland is different and uniquely became a modern state in the 1700s, with increased trade due to the Act of Union in 1707. By contrast, in Europe nationalism took hold with the demise of empires and the rise of nation states. Many European states used nationalism during the 1800s to deal with the uneven nature of capitalism.

== Early life and career ==
Nairn was born on 2 June 1932 in Freuchie, Fife, the son of a primary school headmaster. He attended Dunfermline High School and the Edinburgh College of Art before graduating from the University of Edinburgh with an MA in philosophy in 1956.

He was awarded a British Council scholarship in 1957 to the Scuola Normale Superiore in Pisa, where he stayed for some time. As well as becoming fluent in Italian, it was during this sojourn that he began to transcend the limits of orthodox Marxism, particularly while exploring the writings of Antonio Gramsci. "If you were a Marxist [in Britain] you were a Stalinist or a Trotskyist," he later explained, "but I was insulated against that by my Italian experience... there was a much wider intellectual, cultural atmosphere that one could go on breathing."

During the 1960s, Nairn studied at the University of Dijon (now the University of Burgundy), worked in warehouses as a nightwatchman, and taught at various institutions, including the University of Birmingham (1965–66).

Nairn came to national prominence as a lecturer at Hornsey College of Art during 1968, where he became involved in a student occupation. The occupation offered a major critique of the education system at the time. After the authorities regained control, he was dismissed.

He was then absent from secure university posts for three decades. He was at the Transnational Institute, Amsterdam, from 1972 to 1976, but resigned when his efforts to steer it towards becoming a pan-European thinktank failed. He then worked on and off as a journalist and television researcher (mainly for Channel 4 and Scottish Television, Glasgow) before a year at the Central European University with Ernest Gellner (1994–95) and then setting up and running a Masters course on Nationalism at the University of Edinburgh (1995–99).

In 2001, he was invited to take up an Innovation Professorship in Nationalism and Cultural Diversity at the Royal Melbourne Institute of Technology in Australia and worked with Paul James. He left in January 2010 when in his late 70s. Returning to France and then Britain, he was fellow at the Institute for Advanced Study of Durham University (2009).

== Work ==
Nairn was considered one of the key thinkers of the British New Left, although he expressed dissent with what he saw as its generally nationalist nostalgia. From 1962, with Perry Anderson in New Left Review, he developed a thesis (the "Nairn-Anderson thesis") to explain why Britain did not develop in a 'normal' way, which was defined as the continental European movement to anti-clericalism and Republicanism since the 1789 French Revolution.

By contrast, Nairn was long an advocate of European integration, an argument he first put forward in The Left Against Europe (1973), when leftist opinion in the UK was very much against the idea.

He was an advocate of Scottish independence as well as devolution of power to the Scottish Parliament and the Welsh Assembly and criticised the 1990s–2000s Blair Labour government for not giving those bodies enough power. While critical of Scottish elites, Nairn considered that Scotland's economic potential had been limited by the concentration of power in London in combination with what he claimed was the archaic nature of the British state.

An anthology of NLR articles, The Break-Up of Britain (1977, revised 1982) is the best known of Nairn's books on the nationalism theme. It is a Marxist critique of the emergence of worldwide nationalism. Essentially, Nairn contends that imperialism from the core countries (Western Europe) amongst the peripheral nations (Africa, Asia, Australia, etc.) motivated the peripheral elites to mobilise their exploited masses. As such, they created powerful myths and stories based on local artefacts and local happenings. The peripheral intelligentsia, as he denoted them, were inspired by both romanticism and populism. In a chapter devoted to him, Enoch Powell is placed in both traditions. Nairn's ideas on nationalism were in the news during Britain's protracted Brexit negotiations from 2016, and Scotland's desire to remain in the European Union; his major works have been reprinted.

His republican inclinations meant that his The Enchanted Glass (1988) was one of the earliest serious modern investigations into the British monarchy from an abolitionist perspective. It won the Saltire Society Scottish Book of the Year Award. Here and elsewhere Nairn used the term 'Ukania' to suggest the irrational and Ruritanian nature of the British constitutional monarchy. His original source for the term is the nickname "Kakania" that Robert Musil uses for the dual Austro-Hungarian monarchy in The Man Without Qualities. An updated edition of The Enchanted Glass (published by Verso) appeared in 2011.

== Personal life and death ==
Tom Nairn lived in Scotland with his long-term partner, Millicent Petrie, and had two stepchildren. He died on 21 January 2023, at the age of 90.

== Honours ==
In 2009, Nairn was elected a fellow of the Academy of Social Sciences in Australia.

== Major works ==
Books

- Quattrocchi, A. and Nairn, T. (1968) The Beginning of the End: France, May 1968 Panther Books
- Students and Staff of Hornsey College of Art (1969) The Hornsey Affair, Penguin Books
- Nairn, T. (1973) The Left against Europe, Penguin
- Nairn, T. (1977) The Break-up of Britain: Crisis and Neonationalism, London: NLB (2nd ed. 1981 Verso; 3rd 2003 Common Ground Pub) (paperback released in 1981 and republished in 2021), ISBN 978-1-78168-320-0
- Nairn, T. (1988) The Enchanted Glass: Britain and Its Monarchy, London: Radius (2nd ed. 1994, Vintage. 3rd ed. 2011), ISBN 0-09-172955-6
- Nairn, T. (1992) Auld enemies: Essays from the "Nairn on Monday" column, The Scotsman, Glasgow : Common Cause
- Nairn, T. (1997) Faces of Nationalism: Janus Revisited, Verso (2nd ed. 2005), ISBN 1-85984-194-5
- Quattrocchi A and Nairn, T. (1998) The Beginning of the End: France, May 1968, Verso
- Nairn, T. (2001) After Britain: New Labour and the Return of Scotland, Granta, ISBN 1-86207-293-0
- Nairn, T. (2002) Pariah: Misfortunes of the British Kingdom, Verso
- Nairn, Tom; James, Paul (2005). Global Matrix: Nationalism, Globalism and State-Terrorism. London and New York: Pluto Press.
- Nairn, T (2006) Global Nations, Verso
- James, Paul; Nairn, Tom (2006). Globalization and Violence, Vol. 1: Globalizing Empires, Old and New. London: Sage Publications.
- Nairn, T (2006) Gordon Brown: Bard of Britishness, Cardiff: Institute of Welsh Affairs

Articles and media

He wrote many articles for the London Review of Books and contributed regularly to openDemocracy as well as other publications.

- Nairn, Tom (November–December 1975). "The modern janus". New Left Review. I (94). (Also reprinted in Break-up.)
- Nairn, T. (1976) Northern Ireland: Relic or Portent?, in Burnett, Ray (ed.), Calgacus No. 3, Spring 1976, pp. 36 – 50, ISSN 0307-2029
- Nairn T. (1976), review of The Radical Approach edited by Gavin Kennedy, in Question, July 1976, pp. 8 – 10
- Nairn, T. (1980), Internationalism: A Critique, in The Bulletin of Scottish Politics No. 1, Autumn 1980, pp. 101 – 125
- Nairn, Tom (2008). "Globalisation and nationalism: the new deal". openDemocracy. openDemocracy Foundation for the Advancement of Global Education. The Edinburgh lecture.
- Articles on OpenDemocracy.net
- Nairn, Tom; Davies, B.; Kay, N. (2008), "Scotland and globalisation", in Reid, H.; Scott, P.H. (eds.), The Independence Book: Scotland in Today's World, Edinburgh, Scotland: Luath Press.
- Nairn, Tom (2008). "Byzantium". Arena. Bauer.
