= Manifesto for a Global Economic Ethic =

In the declaration Manifesto for a Global Economic Ethic fundamental principles and values of a global economy are set forth, according to the Declaration toward a Global Ethic issued by the Parliament of World Religions (Chicago 1993). In 2009 the Manifesto for a Global Economic Ethic was presented at a joint event with the UN Global Compact at the UN headquarters in New York. First signatories include renowned international leaders such as Mary Robinson, former president of Ireland, and Archbishop emeritus Desmond Tutu, Nobel Peace Prize Laureate.

== Content of the Manifesto ==
The Manifesto lays out the fundamental principles and values of a global economy. The goal of the manifesto is to start a dialog. It aims to address all stakeholder groups in the business world, to create a cultural and ethical framework across borders. All players should respect and protect the internationally accepted codes of conduct for business, and contribute to realizing them within their sphere of influence. The signatories commit themselves to be guided by both the letter and the spirit of this declaration in their day-to-day business decisions, actions, and conduct.

=== Fundamental principle: Humanity ===
The principle of humanity must be the ethical yardstick for all economic action.

- Sustainability
- Respect
- Fair Cooperation
- Golden Rule

=== Basic values for global economic activity ===
The following basic values for doing business globally further develop the principle of humanity. They make suggestions for decisions, actions, and general behaviour in the practical sphere of economic life.

- Non-violence and Respect for life
- Justice and Solidarity
- Honesty and Tolerance
- Mutual respect and partnership

== Publications ==
- Küng, H., Leisinger, K., Wieland, J. (2010): Manifesto Global Economic Ethic. Consequences and Challenges for Global Businesses. Manifest Globales Wirtschaftsethos. Konsequenzen und Herausforderungen für die Weltwirtschaft. Munich: dtv. ISBN 978-3-423-34628-3
