= Association of Learned and Professional Society Publishers =

Trade association of non-profit publishers

- Abbreviation: ALPSP
- Formation: 1972; 54 years ago
- Legal status: A company limited by guarantee and incorporated in England and Wales
- Purpose: To connect, inform, develop and represent the scholarly and professional publishing community and to be an advocate on behalf of the non-profit publishing sector
- Headquarters: Egale1, 80 St Albans Road, Watford, Hertfordshire WD17 1DL, UK
- Members: Nearly 300 members in 30 countries
- Chief Executive: Wayne Sime
- Website: www.alpsp.org

The Association of Learned and Professional Society Publishers (ALPSP) is an international trade association of non-profit publishers created in 1972. It is the largest association of scholarly and professional publishers in the world, with over 300 members in 30 countries.

== ALPSP awards ==
The ALPSP Awards recognise excellence and innovation in scholarly communications. The winners are announced at the ALPSP Conference.

ALPSP is an inaugural signatory of the SDG Publishers Compact, and has taken steps to support the achievement of the Sustainable Development Goals (SDGs) in the publishing industry. These include creation of the University Press Redux Sustainability Award with Cambridge University Press in 2020. The inaugural award was given to the Organisation for Economic Co-operation and Development (OECD) for its SDG Pathfinder, an open-access digital discovery tool for finding content and data relating to the SDGs. Also recognized were Taylor & Francis and Bristol University Press.

== Learned Publishing ==
ALPSP publishes a peer reviewed quarterly journal called Learned Publishing, covering the field of scholarly publishing. The journal is Open Access (OA) and published on behalf of ALPSP by Wiley. The journal is indexed and has an Impact Factor, and is considered to be of a high level and to offer stimulating insights on the evolution of digital publishing.

The current Editor-in-Chief is Laura Dormer, and the North American Editor is Michelle Urberg.

== Events ==
ALPSP runs a series of events including training workshops, seminars, webinars and other events at various meetings, such as Frankfurt and London Book Fairs. It runs a three-day annual conference that attracts several hundred participants from around the world.

== See also ==
- List of university presses
- List of academic journals associated with learned and professional societies
