= United Nations Global Compact =

Non-binding United Nations pact

UN Global Compact
- Formation: 26 July 2000
- Type: Framework and Mechanism
- Legal status: Active
- Head: Sanda Ojiambo, CEO & Executive Director
- Website: unglobalcompact.org

The United Nations Global Compact is a non-binding United Nations (UN) pact to get businesses and firms worldwide to adopt sustainable and socially responsible policies, and to report on their implementation. The UN Global Compact is the world's largest corporate sustainability and corporate social responsibility initiative, with more than 20,000 corporate participants and other stakeholders in over 167 countries. The organization consists of a global agency, and local "networks" or agencies for each participating country. Under the Global Compact, companies are brought together with UN agencies, labour groups and civil society.

The UN Global Compact is a principle-based framework for businesses, stating ten principles in the areas of human rights, labour, the environment and anti-corruption. The declared objectives of the participants and stakeholders are to "mainstream the ten principles in business activities around the world" and to "catalyse actions in support of broader UN goals, such as the Millennium Development Goals (MDGs) and Sustainable Development Goals (SDGs)". The organization solicits commitments to specific sustainability and social responsibility goals from CEOs and highest-level executives, and in turn offers training, peer-networks and a functional framework for responsibility, taking a "learning model" for corporate change, rather than a regulatory one.

The UN Global Compact was announced by UN Secretary-General Kofi Annan in an address to the World Economic Forum on 31 January 1999 and was officially launched at UN headquarters in New York City on 26 July 2000. The Global Compact Office works on the basis of a mandate set out by the UN General Assembly as an organization that "promotes responsible business practices and UN values among the global business community and the UN System". The UN Global Compact is a founding member of the United Nations Sustainable Stock Exchanges (SSE) initiative along with the Principles for Responsible Investment (PRI), the United Nations Environment Programme Finance Initiative (UNEP-FI), and the United Nations Conference on Trade and Development (UNCTAD).

== The Ten Principles ==
The UN Global Compact was initially launched with the first nine Principles. On 24 June 2004, during the first Global Compact Leaders Summit, Kofi Annan announced the addition of the tenth principle against corruption in accordance with the United Nations Convention Against Corruption adopted in 2003.

Human Rights

- 1 Businesses should support and respect the protection of internationally proclaimed human rights; and
- 2 Make sure that they are not complicit in human rights abuses.

Labour

- 3 Businesses should uphold the freedom of association and the effective recognition of the right to collective bargaining;
- 4 The elimination of all forms of forced and compulsory labour;
- 5 The effective abolition of child labour; and
- 6 The elimination of discrimination in respect of employment and occupation.

Environment

- 7 Businesses should support a precautionary approach to environmental challenges;
- 8 Undertake initiatives to promote greater environmental responsibility; and
- 9 Encourage the development and diffusion of environmentally friendly technologies.

Anti-Corruption

- 10 Businesses should work against corruption in all its forms, including extortion and bribery.

The Ten Principles represent a set of core values drawn from major international agreements. The Ten Principles and the UN Sustainable Development Goals (SDGs) are considered to be strongly aligned with Pope Francis' Encyclical Laudato Si', sharing "a common vision for business". Both call for wide social engagement and the involvement of both business and civil society.

== Facilitation ==
The UN Global Compact is not a regulatory instrument, having a "guiding rather than binding character". It is sometimes referred to as soft law, although it may not fit the conventional understanding of that term as it is used in international law. Rather it is a forum for discussion and a network for communication including governments, companies and labour organisations, whose actions it seeks to influence, and civil society organisations, representing its stakeholders. The UN Global Compact says that once companies declare their support for the principles "This does not mean that the Global Compact recognizes or certifies that these companies have fulfilled the Compact's principles." Instead, as mentioned in a 2015 interview with then-Executive Director, Lise Kingo, "we are the guide dogs, not the watchdogs", with the organization seeking to prioritize providing resources and support instead of attempting to enforce discipline.

The UN Global Compact's goals are intentionally flexible and vague, but it distinguishes the following channels through which it provides facilitation and encourages dialogue: policy dialogues, learning, local networks and projects. The Global Compact creates resources and guides that business and non-profit organizations may use in their efforts to support the Compact's overall mission.

One such example is the SDG Compass, developed in collaboration with the Global Reporting Initiative (GRI) and World Business Council for Sustainable Development (WBSCD), which is a collection of resources (analysis of the goals, indicators for businesses, tools for stakeholders) that companies can utilize in finding out their role in helping to achieve the SDGs. The Sustainable Ocean Business Action Platform of the UN Global Compact has been actively supporting the launch in June 2020 of the Seaweed Manifesto, the result of a collaborative work of seaweed supporters from private sector, research institutions, UN agencies and civil society, initiated by the Lloyd's Register Foundation. Building on the Manifesto's recommendations, the UN Global Compact, in partnership with the Lloyd's Register Foundation and the French Centre National de la Recherche Scientifique (CRNS), launched the Global Seaweed Coalition in March 2021, a global coalition to support a safe, sustainable and scalable seaweed industry.

Following its creation in 2000 the Global Compact initially focused on support for Ten Principles and the Millennium Development Goals. After the MDG expired in 2015, their top priority became supporting the Sustainable Development Goals, and the SDGs' accompanying 2030 deadlines. The UN Global Compact hopes to play a critical role in helping signatories and governments to work to achieve the SDGs.

Businesses may be becoming more directly involved in government partnerships and more open to private sector interventions such as carbon pricing and other mechanics to help curb climate effects within the scope of business solutions. However, research shows that global carbon dioxide emissions are 60% higher in 2021 than in 1990, and now require fundamental system-level changes.

== History ==
The first Global Compact Leaders Summit, chaired by Secretary-General Kofi Annan, was held in UN Headquarters in New York on 24 June 2004, to bring "intensified international focus and increased momentum" to the UN Global Compact. The second Global Compact Leaders Summit, chaired by Secretary-General Ban Ki-moon, was held on 5–6 July 2007 at the Palais des Nations in Geneva. It adopted the Geneva Declaration on corporate responsibility. Marking the 10th anniversary of the Global Compact's launch, the Global Compact Leaders Summit 2010 took place on 24–25 June 2010 in New York. On the occasion, the Blueprint for Corporate Sustainability Leadership identifying leadership criteria linked to implementation of the ten principles, efforts to support development objectives, and engagement in the Global Compact was released. In 2009 Rotary International partnered with the UN Global Compact. This was a very friendly partnership since Rotary International played a role in the chartering of the United Nations. .In 2017, in order to address the health risks posed by tobacco and the harm caused to human beings by anti-personnel mine and cluster munition, companies manufacturing these products were excluded and barred from participating.

== UN Global Compact – Cities Programme ==
In 2001, the City of Melbourne proposed that cities, as well as corporations, should be allowed to join the UN Global Compact, arguing that this would provide a clear statement of a city's commitment to positive change, as well as motivating participation in international dialogue. The proposal was accepted, and the UN Global Compact - Cities Programme was launched in 2002. It was formed as an urban-focused component of the Global Compact with its International Secretariat initially located in Melbourne, Australia. The aim of the programme is to improve urban life in cities throughout the world.

Melbourne became the first city to engage in the Global Compact in June 2001.

In April 2003, under the directorship of David Teller, a framework called the Melbourne Model was developed that went beyond the Ten Principles. It begins by drawing the resources of government, business and civil society into a cross-sector partnership in order to develop a practical project that addresses a seemingly intractable urban issue. In 2007, the then Director, Paul James (2007–2014) and his colleagues Andy Scerri and Liam Magee, took this methodology further by integrating the partnership model with a four-domain sustainability framework called 'Circles of Sustainability'.

In 2007, the Secretariat moved from the Committee For Melbourne to the Global Cities Institute at RMIT University, itself affiliated with UN-HABITAT. There, projects associated with city-based responses to global climate change and globalization became increasingly important. The Melbourne Model was further elaborated, with a sustainability indicators programme developed as a way of assessing and monitoring progress. In 2012, the Circles of Sustainability method was elaborated to guide a city or urban region through a rigorous assessment process. As one of the outcomes, it provides a figurative image of the overall sustainability of that city to illustrate its strengths and weaknesses.

In 2015, RMIT Professor Ralph Horne became the third director of the UN Global Compact Cities Programme and in February 2016 an Urban Thinkers Campus was organised at RMIT Melbourne in collaboration with World Vision International as part of the buildup to UN Habitat III. The theme of the Urban Thinkers Campus was Ethical Cities: Locking in Liveability. This was followed by the organisation of an Urban Innovation Forum on Ethical Cities in July 2016 in Barcelona, Spain as a collaboration between the UN Global Compact - Cities Programme, RMIT Europe and UN-Habitat. In Fall 2016, RMIT University and the UN Global Compact Cities Programme launched a Massive Open Online Course on FutureLearn with the title of Ethical Cities: Shaping the Future of Your City.

As of August 2020 there were 120 participants in the City Network, 85 of them in Latin America and the Caribbean. Milwaukee and San Francisco were the only U.S. member cities. The Cities Programme ended in 2021.

== Local networks ==
Local networks of the Global Compact advance the initiative and its ten principles at a country level. Currently, there are approximately 85 Local Networks in total. These networks help companies and non-profit organizations understand what responsible business means within diverse national, cultural, and linguistic contexts. Additionally, there are related programmes for particular topics of interest, such as the Business for Peace initiative, that bring awareness to businesses and other organizations about instability and conflict, such that organizations can help to address these concerns from their own perspective and with the assistance of their local networks. Local connections to supplement the international connections made by the Global Compact at large can help to broaden the engagement and impact of members. Local Networks are independent, self-governed and self-managed entities, and work closely with the UN Global Compact's New York headquarters, and coordinate as points of contact for UN Global Compact signatories in their respective countries. The Local Networks of the Global Compact are showcased, but not limited to the interactions chronicled below:

=== Australia ===
- The Global Compact Local Network in Australia was established in 2009 by a steering committee drawn from the Australian business community and stakeholder groups. It was formally incorporated in 2011. as the Global Compact Network Australia Limited, and elections were held for the inaugural board of directors. In 2011 it established two business-led leadership groups dealing with human rights and anti-corruption. The GCNA draws its funding directly from members and member-based activities, in contrast to many networks who rely in part on government funding.

=== Bulgaria ===
- The Global Compact Local Network in Bulgaria was founded in January 2003, under the auspices of President Georgi Parvanov. The voluntary initiative unites 120 Bulgarian companies, non-governmental organizations and academia into a unique network. All members are united around the idea of applying the ten principles of the UN Global Compact in their daily practices and to be responsible corporate citizens. In 2006, to strengthen and enhance the role of the initiative, a management structure was introduced consisting of an advisory board and a Secretariat. For the period 2006-2010, the network activities were supported by the United Nations Development Programme Bulgaria. With the active participation and financial contribution of its members Global Compact Bulgaria organized numerous initiatives related to environment, health, education and youth. Among them are the projects: "Unleashing Entrepreneurship"; "Love Bridge"; "Sharing Best Practices in Corporate Social Responsibility".
- With the end of the support from UNDP Bulgaria, the Global Compact Local Network in Bulgaria had to identify and formulate a new strategy for sustainability. So, between 2009 and 2010 the members signed an institutional framework for future organizational development. As a result, on 10 September 2010, a new independent organization was founded – Association Global Compact Network Bulgaria. Its members are 20 leading companies and organizations in Bulgaria, and members of the UN Global Compact as well. The Association is managed by a steering committee and control committee. Their main goals are to learn from each other, to communicate, to generate an advocacy impact and to initiate dialogue or partnerships with other actors such as the government, local authorities, labour organisations and civil society organizations.

=== France ===
- The Global Compact Network France was established in 2004. It is the second largest local network of the UN Global Compact after Spain, with more than 1,100 participants in 2017. The main aim of the Global Compact Network France is to add personalized value to the French participants of the Global Compact, in order to help them to make progress in their CSR approach and enlarge the Global Compact network. The local network is entirely financed by its members.

=== Germany ===
- The GCN Germany (DGCN) was created in the year 2000 on the initiative of German companies as one of the first national platforms. Its tasks and obligations as an official local Network are defined in a Memorandum of Understanding with the UN Global Compact; it may only bear the name of the Global Compact Network Germany as long as it carries out these tasks and fulfils these obligations.
- The GCN Germany brings together all German signatories of the UN Global Compact. The network comprises more than 780 German companies and organizations from civil society, science, and the public sector and serves to provide information on issues of corporate responsibility, exchange ideas, and develop joint practical solutions.

=== India ===
- The Global Compact Network (GCN) India was formed by organizations from India that participate in the Global Compact. It was registered on 24 November 2003, with the Registrar of Societies, NCT, Delhi, as a non-profit body. The main objective of the Network is to provide a forum for various Indian Companies/ Organizations to exchange experiences, network and work together on activities related to CSR. This is expected to promote sustainable growth besides encouraging good corporate citizenship. The Network acts as an Apex-level nodal agency representing various Indian Corporate bodies/ Institutions/ NGOs/ SMEs, who are committed to the UN Global Compact principles.
- The Global Compact Network India has been one of the pioneering local initiatives of the Global Compact. It is one of the first local networks to be set up as a legal entity. Over the last nine years, the network has seen modest growth and has been able to create a niche for itself within efforts by the business community directed towards realising the vision of sustainable development in India. https://globalcompact.in/our-team/governing-council/ At present Vaishali Nigam Sinha, Co-Founder of ReNew and Chairperson – Sustainability at ReNew Pvt. Ltd., has been elected as President.Ganesh Reddy, Founder & CEO of Citizens Foundation, will serve as Secretary, while Abhishek Ranjan, Senior Director & Global Head – ESG, Managing Trustee – Brillio Foundation at Brillio, has been elected as Joint Secretary..

=== Mexico ===
- The Global Compact Network in Mexico in December 2014 endorsed the commitment of the private sector towards improving gender equality. Echoing the sentiments of initiatives such as the "HeforShe", and the large support of individuals in the region for promoting gender equality and empowering women. Much of this progress is being achieved by practical guidelines for how private entities can make a more diverse, inclusive workplace that creates codes of global business.

=== Spain ===
- The Global Compact Network Spain is the largest local network of signatories to the UN Global Compact. As an independent legal entity launched in 2004, it is managed by a steering committee with a chairman, deputy chairman, secretary, treasurer and 16 directors elected by the network's general assembly. The steering committee includes representatives from large companies, small- and medium-sized enterprises (SMEs), the public sector, educational entities and non-governmental organizations (NGOs). In order to abide by the rules of the Spanish legislature, the general assembly holds a vote each year on budgetary issues and resolutions and nominates the steering committee. The Global Compact Network Spain has been successful in involving SMEs, developing interactive resources and reporting tools and emphasizing human rights through the commitment of the local companies.

=== Syria ===
- The Syria initiative aims at enhancing civic engagement and corporate social responsibility of the private sector by promoting the ten principles of the UN Global Compact as well as forging partnerships between private sector organizations, public sector institutions and civil society. This initiative is a partnership between the Syrian Government represented by the State Planning Commission and the UNDP Country Office in Syria. It was launched under the patronage of the Head of State Planning Commission and in the presence of the Deputy Chairperson of the UN Global Compact in July 2008. The Syrian Global Compact Local Network has 26 businesses, five NGOs, and five federations of commerce and industry. It was displayed among 10 selected ones from around the world in the Global Compact Sixth Annual Local Networks Forum. The Syria story was called a "leadership case" and the Syria Network growth ratio was ranked first among the global top ten in 2008. The UNGC National Advisory Council has been formulated and held its founders' meeting on 15 October 2008, with the participation of leaders from the Syrian private sector, international corporate representatives, local and international civil society organizations, UNDP, the Syrian Government, media and education sectors.

== Criticism ==
Criticisms of the Global Compact often hinge on its choice to position itself as a voluntary organization rather than a regulatory one. Critics argue that in the absence of effective monitoring and enforcement provisions, the Global Compact fails to hold corporations accountable. Moreover, these critics argue that companies could potentially misuse the Global Compact as a public relations instrument for "bluewashing". Bluewashing refers to the alleged practice of companies claiming their membership or participation in philanthropic and charity-based activity as an excuse, and perhaps as an entry door to increase corporate influence upon international organizations. Peter Utting, deputy director of UNRISD, and Ann Zammit emphasize the importance of critically examining UN-Business Partnerships.

Critics have included an informal network known as Global Compact Critics that cited a lack of mechanisms for sanctioning non-compliance or lack of progress. The Global Compact Critics formally disbanded in February 2015. Similarly, the Alliance for a Corporate-Free UN, which also no longer exists, was a campaigning organization led by Corpwatch that highlighted weaknesses in the principles underlying the Global Compact. The Global Compact was also criticized by Maude Barlow, senior adviser on water issues to the President of the United Nations General Assembly in December 2008, for bluewashing.

While the Global Compact does expel members, this is generally done in response to failure to register reports with the organization, rather than in response to an organization's broader actions. For example, Leaders of the tribe Ayoreo Indians in Paraguay wrote to the UN Global Compact saying they are "concerned and frustrated" by its inclusion of a controversial Brazilian ranching company, Yaguarete Porá. The company has been charged and fined for illegally clearing the Ayoreo's forests and concealing evidence of uncontacted Ayoreo living there. The Ayoreo asked that the company be expelled from the Global Compact. The Brazilian Vale mining company withdrew from the UN Global Compact after civil society groups demanded that it be delisted.

== Support ==
The Global Compact provides a list of over 20,000 active participant organizations, composed of roughly 16,000 businesses and 4,000 non-business entities on its website. The site provides a brief overview of each participant, and a link to their Letter of Commitment (if new), Financial Overview and Contributions (if applicable), Communication on Progress (COP), Communication on Engagement (COE, non-business).

=== Notable member organizations ===
Notable companies who have signed on the Global Compact include, but are not limited to, Starbucks, L'Oreal, Bayer AG, Coca-Cola, 3M, Deloitte, and Zurn. In addition to its signatories, the Global Compact has been repeatedly supported by the UN General Assembly, honoring its 15th anniversary in June 2015 alongside the Secretary-General, Ban Ki-Moon, himself who claims that "Business can be a global force for good" and that "advocacy and example can drive action to achieve a life of dignity for all people".

Other notable organizations that have joined this global movement:

- Unilever
- Nike
- BMW
- Nestlé
- Procter & Gamble
- Siemens
- PepsiCo
- Johnson & Johnson
- Volkswagen
- Accenture
- H&M
- Shell
- Ford Motor Company
- McDonald's
- ABB
- Danone
- Microsoft
- Meridian Gaming
- Chevron
- Adidas
- Oracle
- KPMG
- Proactis
- Ericsson
- AT&T
- General Electric (GE)

== See also ==
- Circles of Sustainability
- Global Compact on Migration
- Manifesto for a Global Economic Ethic
- Global Reporting Initiative
- Corporate social responsibility
- Sustainable development
