= Manfred B. Steger =

Austrian-American professor

- Occupations: Academic and author
- Awards: Michael Harrington Book Award, American Political Science Association (2003)

Academic background
- Education: B.A., Religion and Political Science, University of Hawai’i at Mānoa (1990); M.A., Political Science, University of Hawai’i at Mānoa (1991); Ph.D., Political Science, Rutgers University (1995)
- Alma mater: Rutgers University, New Jersey

Academic work
- Institutions: Whitman College; Illinois State University; RMIT University; University of Hawaiʻi at Mānoa

Manfred B. Steger is an American academic and author. He is a Professor of Sociology at the University of Hawaiʻi at Mānoa.

Steger is most known for his work in social and political theory, primarily focusing on the crucial role of ideas, images, language, beliefs, and other symbolic systems in shaping discourses of globalization.

Steger is the recipient of the 2003 Michael Harrington Book Award from the American Political Science Association. Together with Terrell Carver, he is the book series editor of Globalization, which has resulted in 30 books on the subject.

== Education ==
Steger was born in Wiener Neustadt, Austria and left his country in 1986 to study in the United States. He completed a Bachelor of Arts in both Religion and Political Science from the University of Hawai’i at Mānoa (1990), followed by a Master of Arts in Political Science from the same university (1991). He obtained a Ph.D. in Political Science from Rutgers University, with a focus on political theory, comparative politics, and American politics.

== Academic career ==
Steger began his academic career as a Lecturer in Political Science at Rutgers University (1992–95). After a brief stint as Visiting Assistant Professor of Politics at Whitman College (1995–6), he joined Illinois State University as an Assistant Professor of Politics and Government (1996–1999). There, he was promoted to Associate Professor (1999–2003), and then Professor of Politics and Government (2003–2005). From 2005 to 2011, he held an appointment as the Professor of Global Studies at the School of Global, Urban and Social Studies at RMIT University, Melbourne, Australia. In 2011, he joined the faculty of the University of Hawai’i at Mānoa, where he served as a Professor of Political Science until 2016. Since 2016, he has held the position of Professor of Sociology at the University of Hawai’i at Mānoa.

In March 2016, Steger served as the Eccles Distinguished Visiting Scholar at Southern Utah University. Additionally, he was appointed as an Honorary Professor of Global Studies at RMIT University from 2015 to 2018, held the position of Distinguished Global Fellow in the Center for Advanced Studies at EURAC Research in 2021, and served as a Global Professorial Fellow in the Institute for Culture & Society at Western Sydney University, from 2019 to 2022.

Since 2011, Steger has been an Executive Board Member of the Global Studies Association North America. Since 2022, he has been a Member of the Board of Directors at the University of Hawai’i Professional Assembly.

== Academic research ==
Steger has authored over ninety scholarly articles and book chapters, and has authored or edited more than thirty books on social theory, globalization, and political theory, including: Gandhi’s Dilemma: Nonviolent Principles and Nationalist Power; The Quest for Evolutionary Socialism: Eduard Bernstein and Social Democracy; What Is Global Studies? Theory & Practice; Globalization Matters: Engaging the Global in Unsettled Times; Globalisms: Facing the Populist Challenge, Globalization: A Very Short Introduction, and The Rise of the Global Imaginary: Political Ideologies from the French Revolution to the Global War on Terror.

Steger's research focus lies in studying the shifting political ideologies in interconnected world, with a particular emphasis on intricate and multifaceted social and political processes.

Steger’s research focuses on questions of globalization, global ideologies, transnational political movements, global civil society, and global issues such as global cities, religious globalism, inequality, and human rights (global justice movement). His book The Rise of the Global Imaginary: Political Ideologies from the French Revolution to the Global War on Terror was reviewed by Saskia Sassen, who lauded it as a "brilliant and erudite study on the power of social imaginaries in the past and today." The scholar Teresa Walker states that "Manfred Steger’s critical theory of globalization links the deliberative intent of ideology with the nuts and bolts of economic processes. In doing so, he articulates a much-needed and convincing alternative to the neoliberal worldview."

In 2019, Palgrave Macmillan published a Festschrift on Steger's work, titled Revisiting the Global Imaginary. Theories, Ideologies, Subjectivities: Essays in Honor of Manfred Steger. The book is edited by Chris Hudson, and Erin Wilson who write "Manfred B. Steger's extensive body of work on globalization has made him one of the most influential scholars working in the field of global studies today. His conceptualization of the global imaginary is amongst the most significant developments in thinking about globalization of the last three decades. Revisiting the Global Imaginary pays tribute to Steger's contribution to our intellectual history with essays on the evolution, ontological foundations and methodological approaches to the study of the global imaginary."

== Zen Buddhism ==
In 1981, Steger initiated his Zen training in Austria under Genro Koudela at the Bodhidharma Zendo in Vienna, which was associated with Joshu Sasaki's Rinzai-ji Order in California. Later, in 1986, he continued his training with Robert Baker Aitken at the Diamond Sangha in Honolulu, Hawaii, where he completed his formal koan practice. Since 1988, he has been teaching Zen in various locations such as Honolulu, Austria, Australia, and Princeton, New Jersey. In 1991, he made the decision to step down as Junior Teacher of the Diamond Sangha and, together with his wife Perle Besserman, established the Princeton Area Zen Group, where he assumed the role of the group's first teacher. He and Besserman collaborated on several books about lay Zen practice, notably including Grassroots Zen: Community and Practice in the Twenty-First Century and Zen Radicals, Rebels, and Reformers".

== Awards ==
- 2003 – Michael Harrington Book Award, American Political Science Association

== Bibliography ==
=== Books ===
- The Quest for Evolutionary Socialism (1997) ISBN 9780511558603
- Gandhi's Dilemma: Nonviolent Principles and Nationalist Power (2000) ISBN 9780333915257
- Judging Nonviolence: The Dispute Between Realists and Idealists (2003) ISBN 9780415933971
- The Rise of the Global Imaginary: Political Ideologies from the French Revolution to the Global War on Terror (2008) ISBN 9780199286935
- Neoliberalism: A Very Short Introduction (2010) ISBN 9780199560516
- Globalization: A Very Short Introduction (2013) ISBN 9780199662661
- Justice Globalism: Ideology, Crises, Policy (2013) ISBN 9781446240915
- What Is Global Studies? Theory & Practice (2017) ISBN 9780415684842
- Globalization Matters: Engaging the Global in Unsettled Times (2019) ISBN 9781108456678
- Globalisms: Facing the Populist Challenge (2019) ISBN 9781538129456

== Selected articles ==
- Steger, M. B., & James, P. (2013). Levels of subjective globalization: Ideologies, imaginaries, ontologies. Perspectives on Global Development and Technology, 12(1–2), pages 17–40.
- James, P., & Steger, M. B. (2014). A genealogy of ‘globalization’: The career of a concept. Globalizations, 11(4), pages 417–434.
- Steger, M. B. (2016). Reflections on “critical thinking” in global studies. ProtoSociology, 33, pages 19–40.
- Steger, M. B. (2018). Globalization versus the state: false antinomy or logical fallacy? A response to Clyde W. Barrow and Michelle Keck: Alternatives. Studies in Political Economy, 99(1), pages 97–105.
- Steger, M. B. (2019). Committing to cultures of creativity: the significance of transdisciplinarity. Globalizations, 16(5), pages 763–769.
- Steger, M. B. (2019). Mapping antiglobalist populism: Bringing ideology back in. Populism, 2(2), pages 110–136.
- Steger, M., & James, P. (2020). Disjunctive globalization in the era of the great unsettling. Theory, culture & society, 37(7–8), pages 187–203.
- Steger, M. B. (2021). The state of Globality in a (post)-COVID world. New Global Studies, 15(2–3), pages 117–143.
- Steger, M. B. (2021). Two Limitations of Globalization Theory. Global Perspectives, 2(1), 30035.
- James, P., & Steger, M. B. (2022). On living in an already-unsettled world: COVID as an expression of larger transformations. Globalizations, 19(3), pages 426–438.
