= 2009 G20 London summit =

2nd G20 meeting

G20 Summit on Financial Markets and the World Economy 2nd G20 summit
- 1-5 April 2009
- Official logo of the conference
- Host country: United Kingdom
- Cities: London, England, United Kingdom
- Venues: ExCeL London
- Participants: G20, including the leaderships of Argentina, ASEAN, Australia, Brazil, Canada, Chile, China, Ethiopia, EU, FSF, IMF, Indonesia, Japan, LAS, Mexico, NEPAD, Netherlands, Russia, Saudi Arabia, Spain, Switzerland, Thailand, Turkey, UN, WBG, and WTO
- Chair: Gordon Brown

The 2009 G20 London Summit was the second meeting of the G20's heads of government and heads of state, held in London at the ExCeL Exhibition Centre to discuss international trade, management of globalization, trade liberalization, financial markets, and world economy. Prime ministers from the G20 attended the event, along with finance ministers, central bankers, and secretary-generals from various regional and international organizations also represented. Due to the extended membership, it has been referred to as the London Summit.

In June 2013, British newspaper The Guardian revealed that the British government's intelligence and security agency, the Government Communications Headquarters (GCHQ), had spied on computer and phone communications of foreign politicians attending the summit by intercepting their phonecalls, emails, and monitoring computers, in some cases even ongoing after the event via keyloggers that had been installed during the summit. Their actions were sanctioned by the British government and intelligence was passed to its ministers. The policing tactics at the event raised some controversy, particularly over the death of Ian Tomlinson.

== Agenda ==
As hosts, the British government's economic and finance ministry, His Majesty's Treasury, produced an extended agenda pamphlet proposing the issues to be addressed at the London Summit. The explicit goal was "to start the process of reform so as to manage globalization as a force for good in the medium term."

1. Engaging concerted action to counter falling demand and fragile confidence (although different countries have different room for manoeuvre on monetary policy);
2. Developing joint actions to prevent further contagion and support vulnerable emerging and developing markets;
3. Working together to address the flaws in the financial and supervisory architecture that crisis has exposed;
4. Strengthening cross-border co-ordination of financial regulation and international financial institutions, such as the Financial Stability Forum (FSF) and the International Monetary Fund (IMF);
5. Agreeing to boost international trade and trade liberalization, while rejecting protectionism, as a way of moving towards more stable and secure global commodities markets;
6. Reaffirming our shared commitment to meet the Millennium Development Goals.

== Preparation ==
Heads of government and heads of state of the G20 member countries began to prepare for the London Summit months before the effective date, notably with two official meetings dedicated to that preparation, one held in Berlin, Germany, on 22 February 2009 for European leaders, and another in Horsham, Sussex, United Kingdom, on 14 March 2009 for finance ministers.

=== European leaders summit ===
Leaders of the four European Union member countries of the G20, the United Kingdom, France, Germany, and Italy, along with the two then-largest European non-members, Spain and the Netherlands, met in Berlin on 22 February 2009 to prepare for the London Summit and to co-ordinate their actions. The meeting was organised at the initiative of German Chancellor Angela Merkel.

The leaders agreed that markets, financial institutions, and the wide range of financial assets they create, and hedge funds should be subject to appropriate control. In addition, they called for effective sanctions against tax havens. They also agreed to impose sanctions against countries that intend to undermine their work. Finally, they advocated the doubling of funds available to the International Monetary Fund (IMF).

=== Finance ministers summit ===
Finance ministers and central bankers of the G20 met in Horsham on 14 March 2009 to prepare for the London Summit. To restore global growth as quickly as possible, the participants decided to approve coordinated and decisive actions to stimulate demand and employment. They also pledged to fight against all forms of protectionism and to maintain trade and foreign investments.

The members also committed themselves to maintain the supply of credit by providing more liquidity and recapitalising the banking system, and to implement rapidly the stimulus plans. As for central bankers, they pledged to maintain low-rates policies as long as necessary. Finally, the leaders decided to help emerging and developing countries, through a strengthening of the IMF.

To strengthen the financial system, the participants proposed to regulate appropriately all important financial institutions, to register all hedge funds or their managers, and to force them to provide appropriate information as to the risks they take. They proposed to implement regulation to prevent the systemic risks and to curb business cycles, including the limitation of the leverage effect, which amplifies cycles. They announced new measures to prevent and resolve crises, through the strengthening of the International Monetary Fund (IMF) and the Financial Stability Forum (FSF). They agreed to control credit-rating agencies and their compliance with the Code of Conduct of the International Organization of Securities Commissions, off-balance-sheet vehicles, credit-derivatives market, and non-cooperative territories.

=== Gordon Brown's pre-summit meetings ===
In the weeks before the event, British Prime Minister Gordon Brown visited several countries on three continents to try to secure backing for his goals at the London Summit. During the trip Brown was forced to re-clarify his position on fiscal stimulus after criticism from the Governor of the Bank of England. While speaking at the European Parliament in Strasbourg, France, he was challenged by a Member of the European Parliament over his spending plans. He also visited Argentina, Brazil, Chile, and the United States. He strongly attacked protectionism, saying "One of the messages that must come from next week's summit is that we will reject protectionist countries, we will monitor those countries and name and shame if necessary countries that are not following free trade practices".

In the weeks leading up to the London Summit, there had been a growing difference of opinions on the question of implementing further fiscal stimulus. The British and American leaderships were in favour of another round of stimulus packages to try to stimulate the global economy, while the French and German leaderships remained strongly opposed to such measures because of the increased levels of debt which this would cause. On 26 March 2009, Czech Prime Minister Mirek Topolanek strongly criticised the economic expansion policies of U.S. President Barack Obama.

== Attendance ==
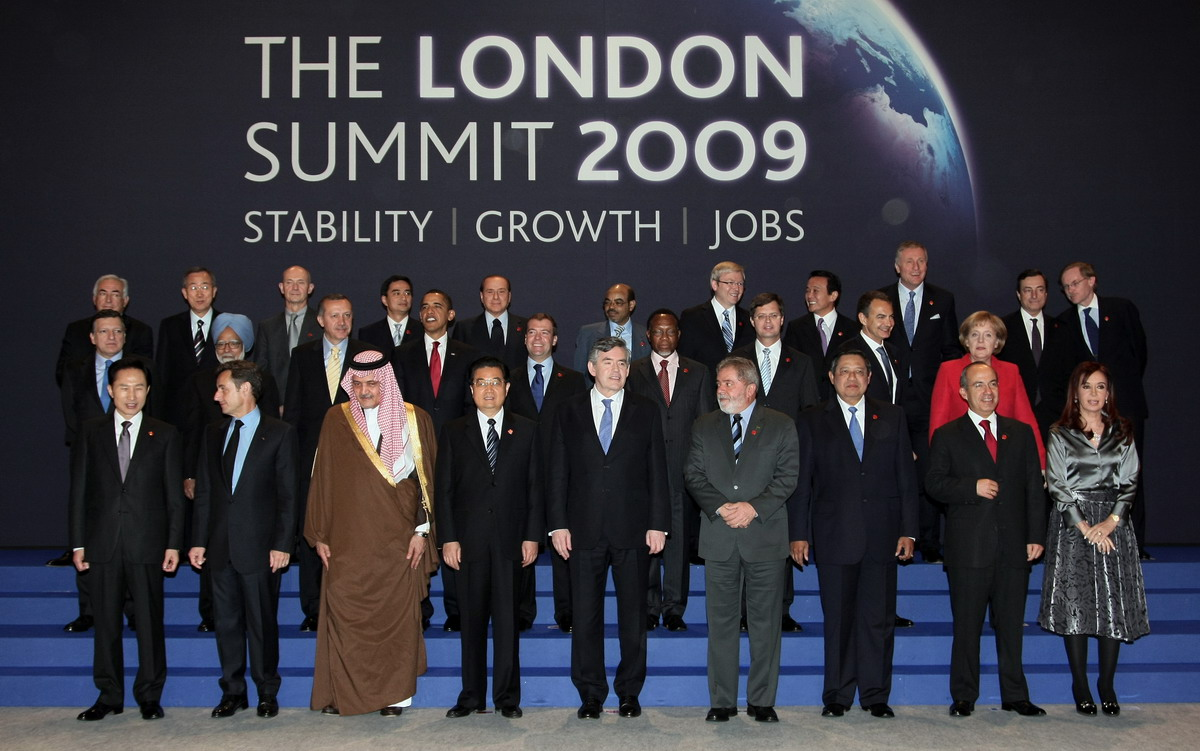
Leaders of the G20 countries present at the London Summit (taken before the proceedings on 2 April 2009).

G20 leaders began gathering in London on 1 April 2009. The summit proper began on the morning of 2 April and took place at the Excel Centre in Custom House, East London. Before leaving for the London Summit, French President Nicolas Sarkozy suggested that if a meaningful deal was not agreed France would walk out of the summit echoing the "empty chair" gesture of then-French President Charles de Gaulle in 1965. At a joint press conference in London, Brown and Obama said that suggestions of a rift were exaggerated. Sarkozy attended a separate press conference with Merkel in which both repeated calls for the summit to agree on more stringent regulation of financial markets and restated their firm opposition to further financial stimulus packages.

On the evening of 1 April, the leaders attended a reception at Buckingham Palace hosted by Queen Elizabeth II. During a photograph, the Queen lightly rebuked the Italian Prime Minister Silvio Berlusconi for shouting too loudly in an effort to attract the attention of U.S. President Barack Obama. The story was featured heavily in the Italian media, and was used by opponents to lambast Berlusconi. After the palace reception, the leaders dined at 10 Downing Street where the food was cooked by British chef Jamie Oliver.

=== Core participants ===
The following participants of the London summit include the core members of the G20, which comprises 19 countries and the European Union; the latter is represented by its two governing bodies, the European Council and the European Commission, as well as other nations and regional organizations invited to take part.

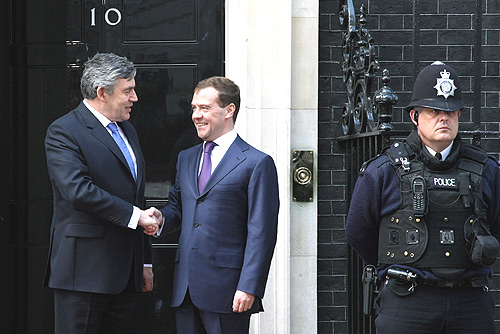
G20 Chairman Gordon Brown and Russian Prime Minister Dmitry Medvedev at the front door of the British Prime Minister's official residence in 10 Downing Street, Westminster, London

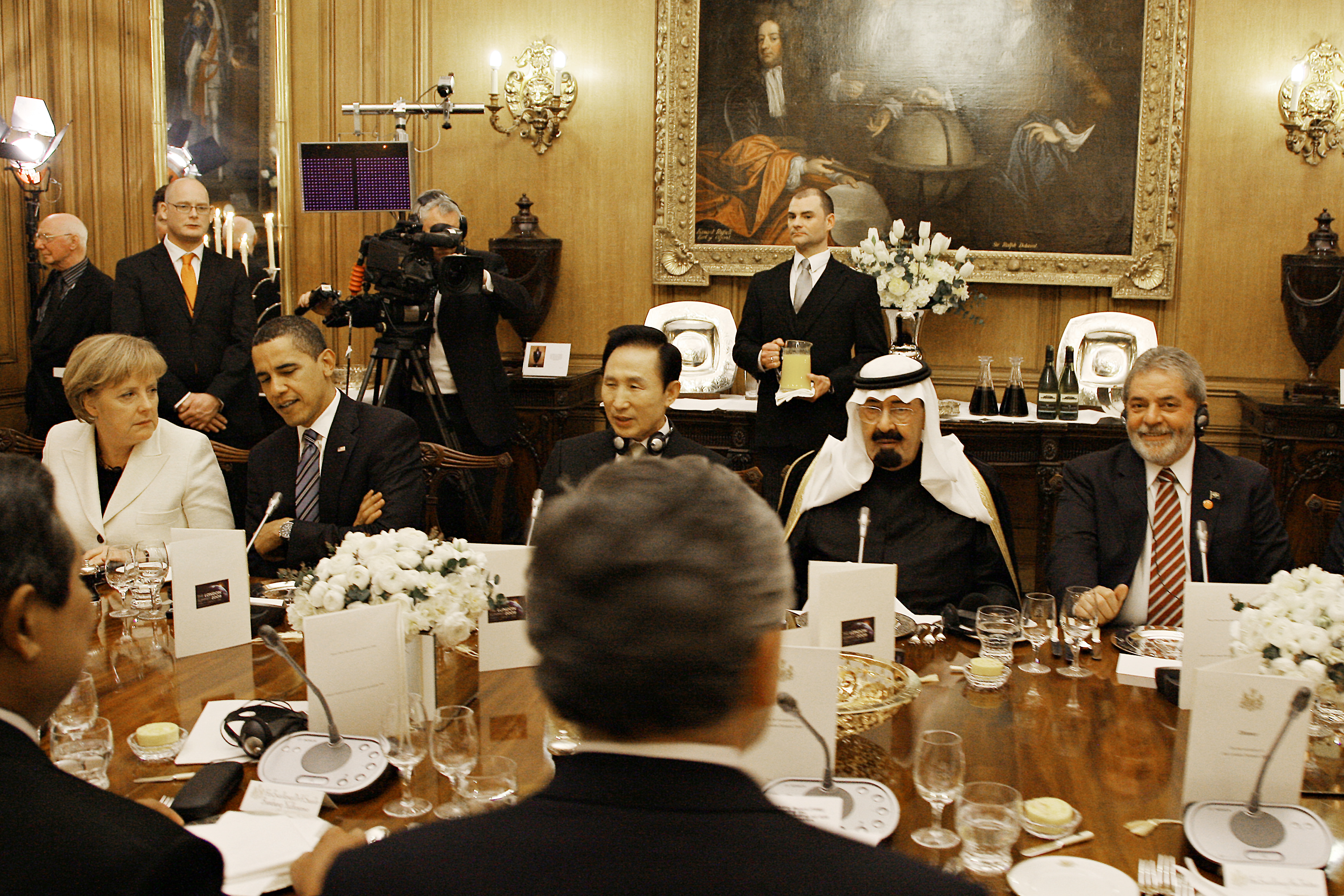
A working dinner at the summit (from left to right): Angela Merkel, Barack Obama, Lee Myung-bak, King Abdullah, and Lula da Silva.

G20 members Host nation and leader are indicated in bold text.
Member		Represented by	Title
(Argentina)	Argentina	Cristina Fernández de Kirchner	President
(Australia)	Australia	Kevin Rudd	Prime Minister
(Brazil)	Brazil	Luiz Inácio Lula da Silva	President
(Canada)	Canada	Stephen Harper	Prime Minister
(China)	China	Hu Jintao	President
(France)	France	Nicolas Sarkozy	President
(Germany)	Germany	Angela Merkel	Chancellor
(India)	India	Manmohan Singh	Prime Minister
(Indonesia)	Indonesia	Susilo Bambang Yudhoyono	President
(Italy)	Italy	Silvio Berlusconi	Prime Minister
(Japan)	Japan	Taro Aso	Prime Minister
(Mexico)	Mexico	Felipe Calderón	President
(Russia)	Russian Federation	Dmitry Medvedev	President
(Saudi Arabia)	Saudi Arabia	Abdullah bin Abdulaziz	King
(South Africa)	South Africa	Kgalema Motlanthe	President
(South Korea)	South Korea	Lee Myung-bak	President
(Turkey)	Turkey	Recep Tayyip Erdoğan	Prime Minister
(United Kingdom)	**United Kingdom**	**Gordon Brown**	**Prime Minister**
(United States)	United States of America	Barack Obama	President
(European Union)	European Union (European Commission)	José Manuel Barroso	President
(European Union)	European Union (European Council)	Mirek Topolánek	President
**Invited states**
State		Represented by	Title
(Ethiopia)	Ethiopia	Meles Zenawi	Prime Minister
(Netherlands)	Netherlands	Jan Peter Balkenende	Prime Minister
(Spain)	Spain	José Luis Rodríguez Zapatero	Prime Minister
(Thailand)	Thailand	Abhisit Vejjajiva	Prime Minister
**International organizations**
Organization		Represented by	Title
(ASEAN)	Association of Southeast Asian Nations (ASEAN)	Surin Pitsuwan	Secretary-General
	Financial Stability Forum (FSF)	Mario Draghi	Chairman
	International Monetary Fund (IMF)	Dominique Strauss-Kahn	Managing Director
African Union	New Partnership for Africa's Development (NEPAD)	Meles Zenawi	Chairman
(United Nations)	United Nations (UN)	Ban Ki-moon	Secretary-General
	World Bank Group (WBG)	Robert Zoellick	President
(World Trade Organization)	World Trade Organization (WTO)	Pascal Lamy	Director-General

== Security operation ==
The security operation, Operation Glencoe, headed by Commander Bob Broadhurst, was projected to cost £7.2 million. Six police forces were used during the operation: the Metropolitan Police, City of London Police, British Transport Police, and the forces of Essex Police, Sussex Police, and Bedfordshire Police. Furthermore, some units from the Ministry of Defence Police have been used. It is the highest security expenditure in British history.

=== GCHQ espionage scandal ===
In June 2013, British newspaper The Guardian revealed that the British government's intelligence and security agency, the Government Communications Headquarters (GCHQ), spied on foreign politicians visiting the summit by intercepting their phonecalls, emails, and monitoring computers, in some cases even ongoing after the event via keyloggers that had been installed during the summit. Their actions were sanctioned by the British government and intelligence was passed to its ministers.

== Protests ==
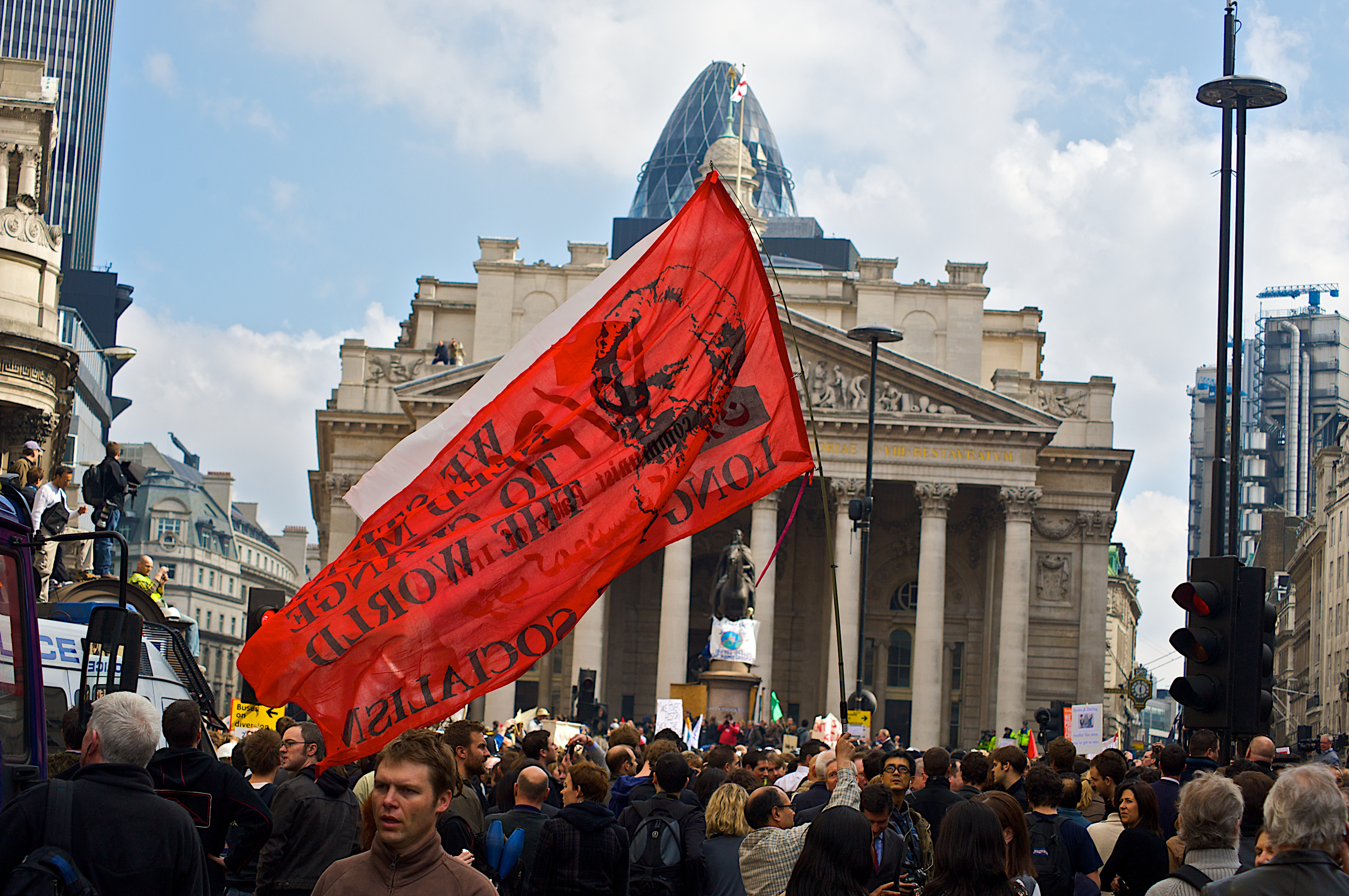
Protesters outside the Bank of England on 1 April 2009

The summit became the focus of protests from a number of disparate groups over various long standing and topical issues. These ranged from disquiet over economic policy, anger at the banking system and bankers remuneration and bonuses, the continued war on terror and concerns over climate change. Although the majority of the protests and protestors were peaceful, instances of violence and criminal damage led to the use of kettling to contain protestors.

=== Death of Ian Tomlinson ===
Ian Tomlinson, a newsagent in the City of London, died within a police cordon of the G20 Meltdown protest near the Bank of England. Initially the City of London Police denied that any incident with the police had occurred. However video, photographic and eyewitness evidence was published in the media, and the Independent Police Complaints Commission (IPCC) confirmed that Tomlinson had been pushed back by police officers minutes before he collapsed and died of a heart attack. Further allegations that Tomlinson had been hit with a baton were supported when additional video footage became public. The IPCC then later ordered a second post mortem and an independent criminal inquiry, with the second post mortem finding that although "there is evidence of coronary atherosclerosis" it was "unlikely to have contributed to the cause of death" and that "the cause of death was abdominal haemorrhage".

== Outcome ==
The London summit was a preliminary step in the process through which the G20 evolved to become "the premier forum for discussing, planning and monitoring international economic co-operation".

=== Financial commitments ===
The G20 leaders reached an agreement which, in principle, provides US$1.1 trillion to various programs designed to improve international finance, credit, trade, and overall economic stability and recovery. There was some dispute about how best to move forward. On one hand, the UK and the US wanted a large financial stimulus. On the other hand, France and Germany wanted stricter financial regulation. Programs include:

- $500 billion increase in the resources pledged by members to the New Arrangements to Borrow, a facility for the IMF to lend money to struggling economies,
- $250 billion in pledges to increase trade finance,
- $250 billion allocation of special drawing rights (SDR) which give IMF members the right to drawn down foreign currency in a crisis,
- $100 billion in commitments for the multilateral development banks to lend to poor countries.

=== Regulation ===
An agreement was also reached to attempt to bring wider global regulation of hedge funds and credit-rating agencies, a common approach to cleaning up bank toxic assets. The G20 leaders also agreed to establish a financial stability forum working with the IMF to ensure wider global co-operation and to provide an early-warning system for future financial crises.

=== No green policies ===
Despite calls for a Green New Deal from Greenpeace and others and general political hype regarding environmental concerns, none of the $1.1 trillion stimulus package was allocated for environmental investment, and no other environmental agreements were made.

=== Decreased influence of the United States ===
One of the general agreements at the London Summit is that there needs to be more government regulations over businesses, and there was a perception that the US would no longer be as dominant as it has been previously. Commenting on the summit, Robert Hormats, vice-chairman of Goldman Sachs International, said "The U.S. is becoming less dominant while other nations are gaining influence."

=== Influence of China ===
The influence of China was very apparent during the G20 with some commentators saying that the G20 was more like a G2.

== See also ==
- Bilderberg Meeting
  - List of Bilderberg participants
- Capitalist peace
- Criticism of capitalism
  - Criticism of the World Economic Forum
- Economic liberalism
  - Free-market capitalism
  - Late-stage capitalism
  - Neoliberalism
- Free trade agreement
  - Free trade area
  - Lists of free trade agreements
- G20
  - List of G20 summits
- Globalization
  - Anti-globalization movement
  - Economic globalization
  - Mundialization
  - Trade globalization
- Great Recession
  - 2008 financial crisis
  - Effects of the Great Recession
  - European debt crisis
  - Great Recession in the United States
- Neo-feudalism
- Post-industrial society
- World economy
- "You'll own nothing and be happy"
