= Corruption in Seychelles =

Corruption in Seychelles describes the prevention and occurrence of corruption in Seychelles. Despite its reputation as a tropical paradise, Seychelles still grapples with persistent corruption problem that undermines the country's economic development. The most notable forms of corruption include petty bribery, influence peddling, financial irregularities and grand corruption cases that involve high-ranking public officials.

== Notable corruption cases ==
As a small country, Seychelles has a close-knit social fabric and this creates an environment where personal relationships and patronage networks often precede formal processes and regulations. This vulnerability is exacerbated by the concentration of economic activity in certain sectors such as tourism and offshore finance industries. Seychelles is, for instance, considered the African tax haven as it is a favourite destination to form offshore companies. The regulatory framework governing Seychelles' financial system permits the formation of companies with opaque ownership structures, often involving layers of shell entities, thereby enabling the concealment of beneficial owners.

The weaknesses in institutional frameworks as demonstrated in the limited transparency in public procurement and the lack of regulatory oversight creates opportunities for graft and corruption. A significant instance of alleged corruption within Seychelles' tourism sector that is potentially linked to institutional weaknesses, involves the controversial granting of development rights for a luxury resort on a protected coastal area. Critics and environmental groups raised concerns about the lack of transparency in the bidding process and allegations of undue influence favouring a specific foreign investor with close ties to government officials.

Notable grand corruption scandals involving senior government officials include the arrest and prosecution of businessman Mukesh Valabhji, a former economics advisor, and the former first lady Sarah Zarqani Rene, the widow of former President France Albert Rene. Both were charged with the theft of state assets, corruption, and money laundering. The most controversial among the charges involved the misappropriation of $50 million, which was donated by the United Arab Emirates to help the country address a balance of payment crisis in 2002. The fund was reportedly funnelled to foreign accounts before it was laundered back to Seychelles to finance privatisation deals. The case joins a series of corruption charges against Valabhji and Rene, which accumulated to an estimated sum exceeding $100 million across several decades.

Corruption scandals have also emerged in Seychelles’ real property sector. The sale of government land at Anse Soleil to a foreign entity is a case in point. It was criticised for undervaluing said property and for not following proper procedures, leading to illicit enrichment and abuse of power. The same corruption allegations were also reported in the reclamation of the 123,000-square-meter island in the eastern district of Anse aux Pin. The project, which was part of the 2020 development of Ile Soleil, reportedly enriched government officials and individuals for skipping formal procedures mandated in the Public Enterprise Monitoring Commission.

Among the papers published during the Wikileaks was a US State Department cable, which revealed how American officials believe "corruption is the critical reason why a country as wealthy as Seychelles" struggles with several persistent economic problems, requiring the $2.1 billion bailout from the International Monetary Fund in 2008.

== Anti-corruption efforts ==
Seychelles is a signatory to the United Nations Convention Against Corruption (UNCAC). The convention is one of its main legal instruments for combatting corruption and provides the legal and institutional foundations for anti-corruption initiatives and national mechanisms. In 2016, Seychelles also passed the Anti-Corruption Act of Seychelles, which established the Anti-Corruption Commission of Seychelles (ACCS). The commission, which was set up as an independent and self-governing body, has the authority to investigate, detect, and prevent corrupt practices.

Seychelles has made significant strides in its anti-corruption efforts and this is demonstrated by its remarkable improvement in the Transparency International Corruption Perceptions Index (CPI). In the 2025 Corruption Perceptions Index, Seychelles scored 68 on a scale from 0 ("highly corrupt") to 100 ("very clean"), down slightly from its highest score of 69 in 2024 but up from its lowest score of 52 in 2012, the year that the current scoring method was instituted.

When ranked by score, Seychelles ranked 24th among the 182 countries in the Index, where the country ranked first is perceived to have the most honest public sector. For comparison with regional scores, the best score among sub-Saharan African countries (Note: Angola, Benin, Botswana, Burkina Faso, Burundi, Cameroon, Cape Verde, Central African Republic, Chad, Comoros, Côte d'Ivoire, Democratic Republic of the Congo, Djibouti, Equatorial Guinea, Eritrea, Eswatini, Ethiopia, Gabon, Gambia, Ghana, Guinea, Guinea-Bissau, Kenya, Lesotho, Liberia, Madagascar, Malawi, Mali, Mauritania, Mauritius, Mozambique, Namibia, Niger, Nigeria, Republic of the Congo, Rwanda, Sao Tome and Principe, Senegal, Seychelles, Sierra Leone, Somalia, South Africa, South Sudan, Sudan, Tanzania, Togo, Uganda, Zambia, and Zimbabwe.) was Seychelles's 68, the average was 32 and the worst was 9. For comparison with worldwide scores, the best score was 89 (ranked 1), the average was 42, and the worst was 9 (ranked 181, in a two-way tie).
