= May De Silva =

Seychellois management expert

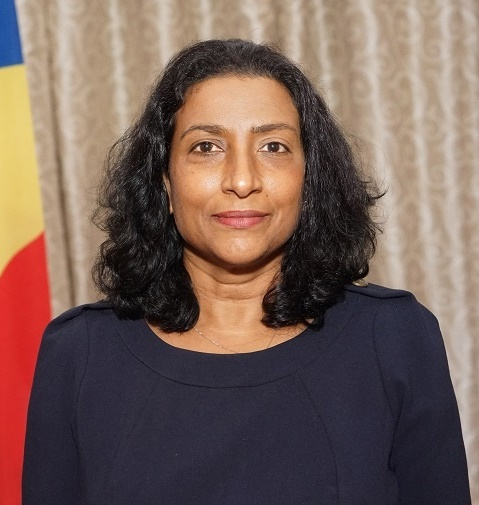

Commissioner of the Anti-Corruption Commission Seychelles
- Incumbent
- Assumed office March 16, 2017
- Appointed by: Danny Faure
- Preceded by: Lucy Athanasius

Personal details
- Born: May De Silva; 1968 (age 57–58) Anse Royale, Mahé, Seychelles
- Education: Ulster University

May De Silva (born c. 1968) is a Seychellois law enforcement officer who presently serves as the Commissioner of the Anti-Corruption Commission Seychelles since March 16, 2017.

== Life and career ==
She was born and raised in Anse Royale, Mahé. She is an alumna of Ulster University where she obtained her Postgraduate degree after studying Management and Executive Leadership. She has been a member of various International Boards and Panels including the Gender Advisory Panel in the Office of the First and Deputy First Minister of Northern Ireland, the Belfast City Council for Good Relations Partnership and she has also chaired the Strategic Women's Reference Group of the Northern Ireland Policing Board. On 16 March 2017, she succeeded Lucy Athanasius as Chief Executive Officer of the Anti-Corruption Commission Seychelles following her appointment by Danny Faure, the President of the Republic of Seychelles. In July 2020, Ms De Silva was appointed on the Commission of Inquiry of the liquidation of the former Plantation Club Hotel which is chaired by ex President of the Court of Appeal, Justice MacGregor and the Auditor General, Mr Gamini Herath. Ms De Silva is also a member of the Seychelles National Committee of the Anti-Money Laundering and Counter Financing of Terrorism - appointed in February 2019.

In April 2021 Ms De Silva’s role changed from CEO to Commissioner of the Anti-Corruption Commission Seychelles which also took on a new mandate of overseeing the former Public Officers Ethics Commission.

In a high-profile case De Silva presided over the investigation of former minister Dolor Ernesta. In November 2021, De Silva arrested the former Economic Advisor to ex-President Rene, Mukesh Valabhji. This is a high-profile case which involves an alleged theft of $50M of public funds.
