= Anti-Corruption Commission Seychelles =

Seychellois government agency

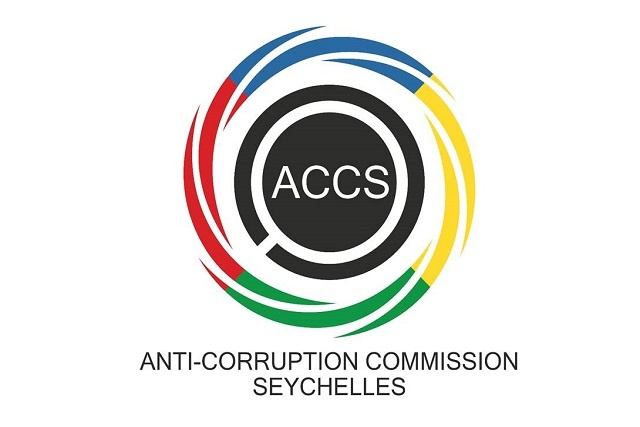
- Official logo

Agency overview
- Formed: March 31, 2016; 10 years ago
- Jurisdiction: Republic of Seychelles
- Headquarters: Victoria, Mahé, Seychelles
- Agency executive: May De Silva, Commissioner
- Website: www.accsey.com

The Anti-Corruption Commission Seychelles (ACCS) is an independent Seychellois government agency formed under the Anti-Corruption Act 2016.

== History ==
Formed in March 2016 after the National Assembly enacted the "Anti-Corruption Law No. 6 of 2016", the ACCS is charged with receiving complaints, investigating, detecting, and preventing corruption-related practices in Seychelles.
