= Financial Stability Forum =

International organization

The Financial Stability Forum (FSF) was a group consisting of major national financial authorities such as finance ministries, central bankers, and international financial bodies. It was first convened in April 1999 in Washington. At the 2009 G20 London summit, the G20 nations established a successor to the FSF, called the Financial Stability Board with an expanded membership and broadened mandate.

== History ==
The Forum was founded in 1999 to promote international financial stability. Its founding resulted from discussions among Finance Ministers and Central Bank Governors of the G7 countries, and a study which they commissioned. The Forum facilitated discussion and cooperation on supervision and surveillance of financial institutions, transactions and events. FSF was managed by a small secretariat housed at the Bank for International Settlements in Basel, Switzerland. The FSF membership included about a dozen nations who participate through their central banks, financial ministries and departments, and securities regulators, including: the United States, Japan, Germany, the United Kingdom, France, Italy, Canada, Australia, the Netherlands and several other industrialized economies as well as several international economic organizations.

At the G20 summit on November 15, 2008, it was agreed that the membership of the FSF will be expanded to include emerging economies, such as China. The 2009 G-20 London summit decided to establish a successor to the FSF, the Financial Stability Board. The FSB includes members of the G20 who were not members of FSF.

== Meetings and actions ==
The Financial Stability Forum met in Rome on 28–29 March 2008 in connection with the Bank for International Settlements. Members discussed current challenges in financial markets, and various policy options to address them from this point forward.

At this meeting, the FSF discussed a report to be delivered to G7 Finance Ministers and Central Bank Governors in April 2008. it identifies key weaknesses underlying current financial turmoil, and recommends actions to improve market and institutional resilience. The FSF discussed work underway at the IMF and OECD with regard to sovereign wealth funds (SWFs). The IMF is working closely with SWFs to identify a set of voluntary best practice guidelines, and is focusing on the governance, institutional arrangements and transparency of SWFs.

On April 12, 2008, the FSF delivered a report to the G7 Finance Ministers which details out its recommendations for enhancing the resilience of the financial markets and financial institutions. These are in five areas:

- Strengthened prudential oversight of capital, liquidity and risk management
- Enhancing transparency and valuation
- Changes in the role and uses of credit ratings
- Strengthening the authorities' responsiveness to risks
- Robust arrangements for dealing with stress in the financial system

== See also ==
- Financial Stability Board
- Offshore Financial Centre
- Tax haven
