= Trade globalization =

Measure of trade's share of GDP

Trade globalization is a type of economic globalization and a measure (economic indicator) of economic integration. On a national scale, it loosely represents the proportion of all production that crosses the boundaries of a country, as well as the number of jobs in that country dependent upon external trade. On a global scale, it represents the proportion of all world production that is used for imports and exports between countries.

- For an individual country, trade globalization is measured as the proportion of that country's total volume of trade to its Gross Domestic Product (GDP):

$$\frac {Imports+Exports} {GDP}$$

- For the world as a whole, trade globalization is the share of total world trade in total world production (GDP), where the sums are taken over all countries:

$$\frac {\sum Exports} {\sum GDP}$$

== Definition ==
Preyer and Brös provide a simple operationalization of trade globalization as "the proportion of all world production that crosses international boundaries". Chase-Dunn et al. note that trade globalization is one of the types of economic globalization, and define trade globalization as "the extent to which the long-distance and global exchange of commodities has increased (or decreased) relative to the exchange of commodities within national societies", and precisely operationalize it as "the sum of all international exports as a percentage of the global product, which is the sum of all the national gross domestic products (GDPs)." Erreygers and Vermeire define trade globalization as "the degree of dissimilarity between the actual distribution of bilateral trade flows and their gravity benchmark, determined only by size and distance." They note that trade globalization would be maximized in a situation where only size and distance affected the intensity of bilateral trade flows - in other words, in a situation where neither trade barriers nor other factors would matter.

Salvatore Babones notes that trade globalization is the indicator of a country's level of globalization most commonly used in empirical literature. Data for most countries in the modern era are available from the World Bank World Development Indicators database.

== Trend ==
Kenji Tul, Chase-Dunn et al. note that there have been cyclical waves of trade globalization, with declines corresponding to wars and economic depressions, and that there has been a steady trend over the centuries for trade globalization to increase. With regard to the modern age, trade globalization increased until 1880, then decreased until 1905, increased again until 1914, decreased during World War I, increased until 1929, decreased until the end of World War II, and has been growing steadily since. They note that the main explanatory factors in this trend are the continued decline in transportation and communication costs, and stability provided by the "hegemonic system" supportive of trade in recent world-systems. Decreases can be explained by wars, and periods of conflict and tension often leading to them, where international actors cannot reach consensus on trade agreements and usually give in to protectionism.

== See also ==
- Global financial system
- International marketing
- International trade
- Internationalization
- List of economic communities
- List of free trade agreements
