= Mukesh Valabhji =

Mukesh Valabhji is an entrepreneur and investor based in the Seychelles. He has served as the owner and chairman of the Capital Management Group since 2006. He was arrested in 2021 in connection with a high-profile case involving an alleged theft of $50M of public funds.

== Early life ==
Mukesh Valabhji was born in the Seychelles, a fourth generation native of the small Indian Ocean archipelago nation. Valabhji was raised in Victoria and went on to graduate from the University of New Orleans in 1983.

== Career ==
=== Seychelles Marketing Board ===
After graduating from the University of New Orleans, Valabhji went on to become the general manager of the Import Division of the newly created Seychelles Marketing Board (SMB) in 1984. Under the leadership of Valabhji, the SMB grew to become the single largest employer and enterprise in the Seychelles . During its most successful period, the SMB accounted for 15 to 20 percent of the total GDP of the Seychelles. Valabhji previously served as Economic advisor to Seychelles President Albert Rene.

=== Capital Management Group ===
After President Rene stepped down from office in 2004, Valabhji left the SMB to become the chairman of the Capital Management Group in 2006. As an organizational leader with the Capital Management Group, he helps the firm deliver investment advisory services in the Seychelles and several other locations throughout the world. The firm focuses its investments primarily on the real estate and hospitality sectors.

Valabhji has invested in the Zil Pasyon luxury hotel and spa resort in the Seychelles. The project is located on the private island of Felicite, approximately 30 nautical miles northeast of Mahe. Accessible only by helicopter or boat, the resort will feature a highly private atmosphere and walking trails to a number of different water sports. Set to open in 2016, the project will be managed by the Six Senses brand, which has initiated a number of tourism projects throughout the world. As a leading investment advisor on the Zil Pasyon project, Valabhji worked closely with Jones Lang Lasalle Hotels of Singapore.

Valabhji is the owner of the telephone, cable television, and broadband internet provider Intelvision.
