= Offshore financial centre =

Corporate-focused tax havens

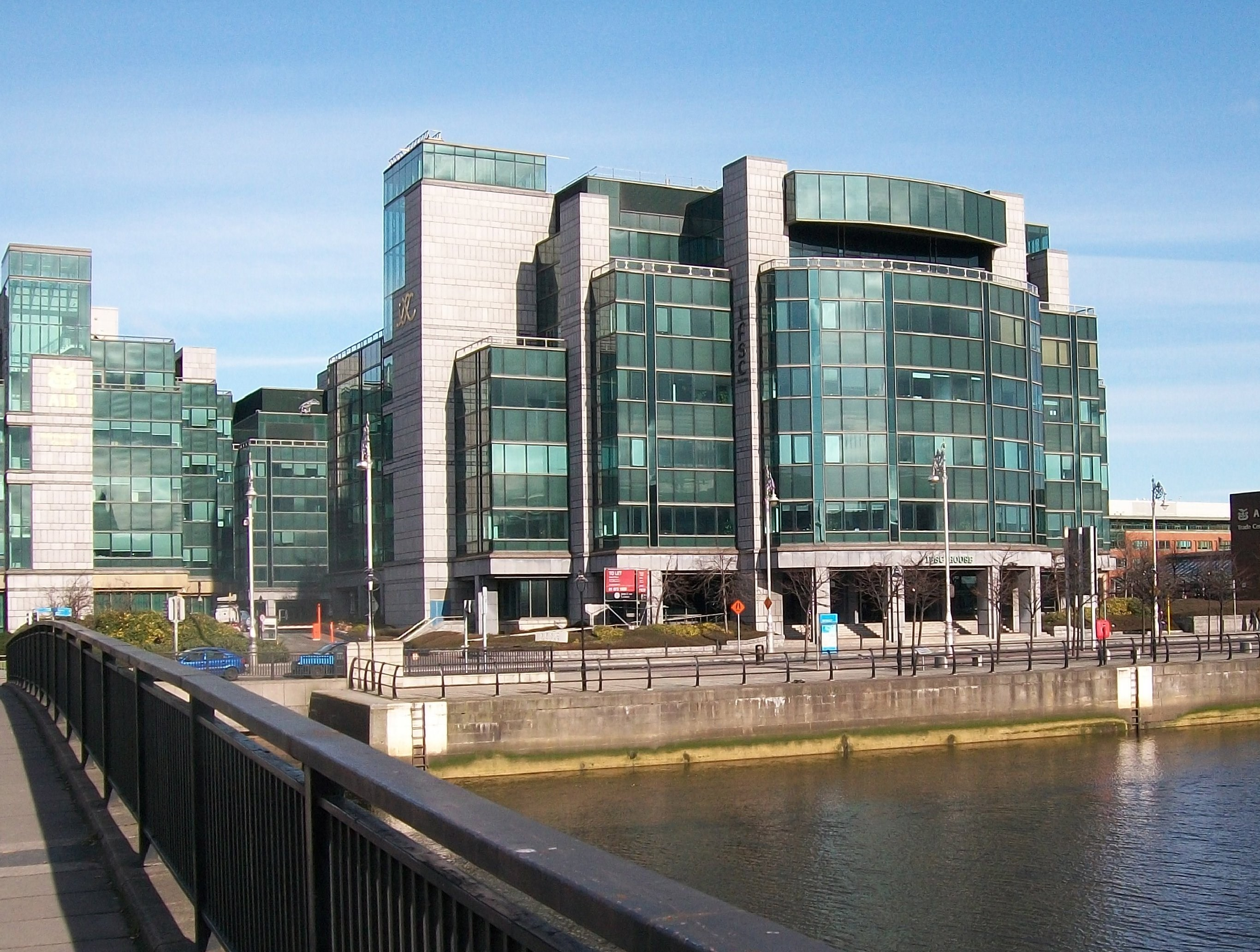
IFSC, Dublin, Ireland. Ireland is a top-five conduit OFC, the largest global tax haven, and the third-largest OFC shadow banking centre.

An offshore financial centre (OFC) is defined as a "country or jurisdiction that provides financial services to nonresidents on a scale that is incommensurate with the size and the financing of its domestic economy." (Note: This is the IMF 2007 definition, however, it is almost identical to the general academic definition, and the other FSF–IMF–definitions of an OFC, see § Definitions.)

"Offshore" is not always literal since many Financial Stability Forum–IMF OFCs, such as Delaware, South Dakota, Singapore, Luxembourg and Hong Kong, are landlocked or located "onshore", but refers to the fact that the largest users of the OFC are non-residents, i.e. "offshore". (Note: It is common to see lists of "offshore financial centres" that are a subset of the Financial Stability Forum–International Monetary Fund OFC list, restricted to the locations that are small islands (e.g. Jersey, Bermuda, Guernsey etc.)) The IMF lists OFCs as a third class of financial centre, with international financial centres (IFCs) and regional financial centres (RFCs). A single financial centre may belong to multiple financial centre classes (e.g. Singapore is an RFC and an OFC).

The Caribbean, including the Cayman Islands, the British Virgin Islands and Bermuda, has several major OFCs, facilitating billions of dollars' worth of trade and investment globally.

During April–June 2000, the Financial Stability Forum–International Monetary Fund produced the first list of 42–46 OFCs using a qualitative approach. In April 2007, the IMF made a revised quantitative-based list of 22 OFCs, (Note: The 104 jurisdictions in the IMF's 2007 quantitative study sample, did not include several of those in the IMF–FSF 2000 lists that are generally recognised as OFCs, such as Andorra, the British Virgin Islands, Liberia, Liechtenstein, Maldives, Marshall Islands, Monaco, Montserrat, and the U.S. Virgin Islands. This may be remedied if more countries begin to collect and supply relevant data, needed in the quantitative study, which is being attempted through the IMF's Information Framework Initiative) and in June 2018, another revised quantitative-based list of eight major OFCs, who are responsible for 85% of OFC financial flows, which include Ireland, the Caribbean, (Note: Mainly the Cayman Islands, Bermuda, and the British Virgin Islands) Luxembourg, Singapore, Hong Kong and the Netherlands. The removal of foreign exchange and capital controls, the early driver for the creation and use of many OFCs in the 1960s and 1970s, (Note: This is a complex area and is considered core to the original development of OFCs back in the 1960s and 1970s, and their role in the Eurodollar and Eurobond markets and other such "offshored" capital markets reliant on "international" pools of capital,) saw taxation and/or regulatory regimes become the primary reasons for using OFCs from the 1980s on. Progress from 2000 onwards from IMF–OECD–FATF initiatives on common standards, regulatory compliance, and banking transparency, has significantly weakened the regulatory attraction of OFCs.

Tax-neutral is a term that OFCs use to describe legal structures where the OFC does not levy any corporation taxes, duties or VAT on fund flows into, during, or exiting (e.g. no withholding taxes) the corporate vehicle. Popular examples are the Irish qualifying investor alternative investment fund (QIAIF), and the Cayman Islands exempted company, which is used in investment funds, corporate structuring vehicles, and asset securitization. Many onshore jurisdictions also have equivalent tax neutrality in their investment funds industries, such as the United Kingdom, the United States, and France. Tax neutrality at the level of these vehicles means that taxes are not paid at the OFC but in the areas where the investors are tax resident. If the OFC levied a tax, this would in most cases reduce the tax paid in the places where investors are tax resident by that same amount, on the principles of avoiding double taxation of the same activity.

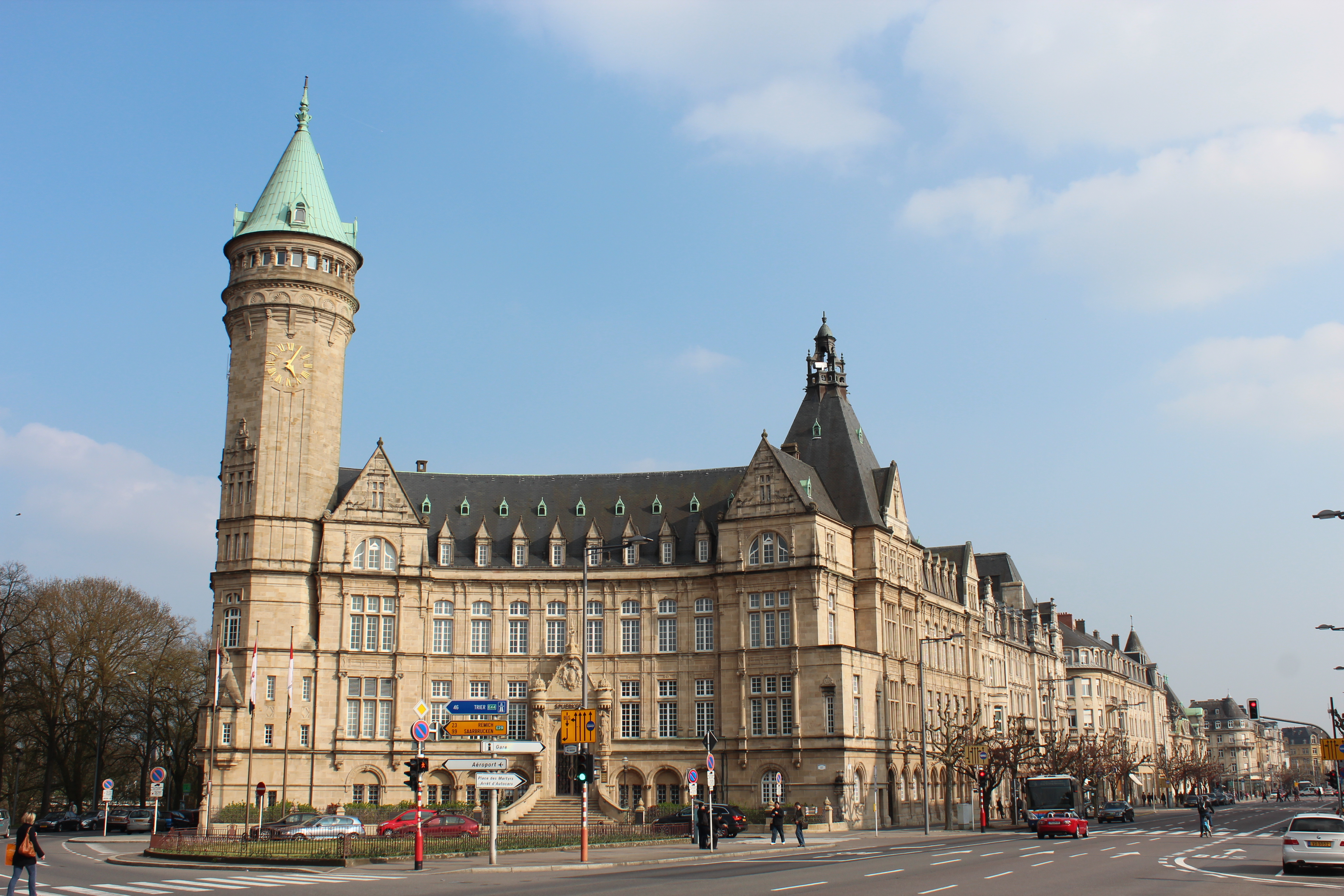
Spuerkeess Bank HQ, Luxembourg. Luxembourg is the second largest Sink OFC, the sixth largest global OFC, and the second largest OFC shadow banking centre.

Research in 2013–14 showed OFCs harboured 8–10% of global wealth in tax-neutral structures, and acted as hubs for U.S. multinationals in particular, to avoid corporate taxes via base erosion and profit shifting ("BEPS") tools (e.g. the double Irish). A study in 2017 split the understanding of an OFC into 24 Sink OFCs, to which a disproportionate amount of value disappears from the economic system), and five Conduit OFCs, through which a disproportionate amount of value moves toward the Sink OFCs). In June 2018, research showed that major onshore IFCs, not offshore IFCs, had become the dominant locations for corporate tax avoidance BEPS schemes, costing US$200 billion in lost annual tax revenues. A June 2018 joint-IMF study showed much of the FDI from OFCs, into higher-tax countries, originated from higher-tax countries (e.g. the UK is the second largest investor in itself, via OFCs).

== Definitions ==
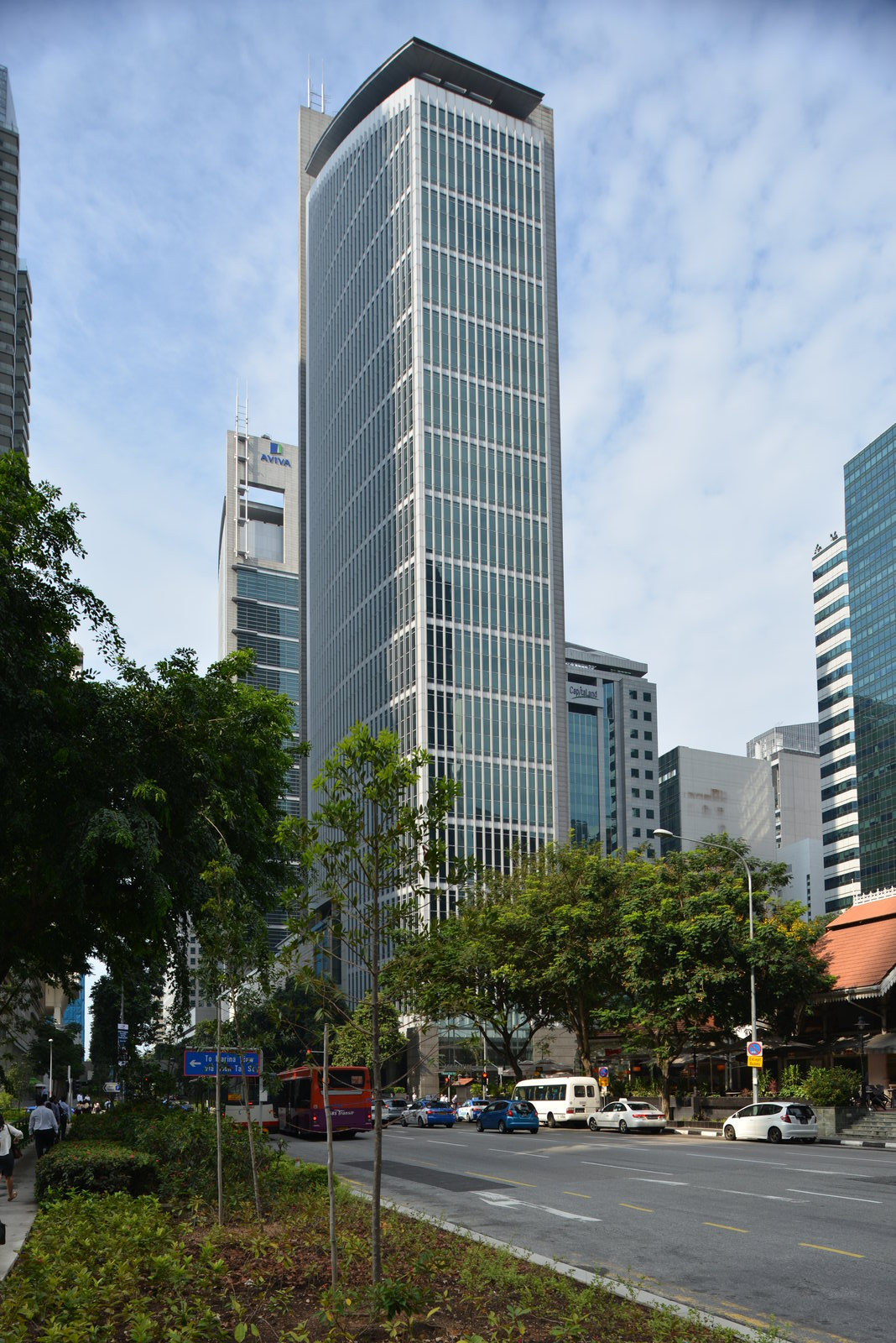
Singapore Exchange, SGX Centre, Singapore

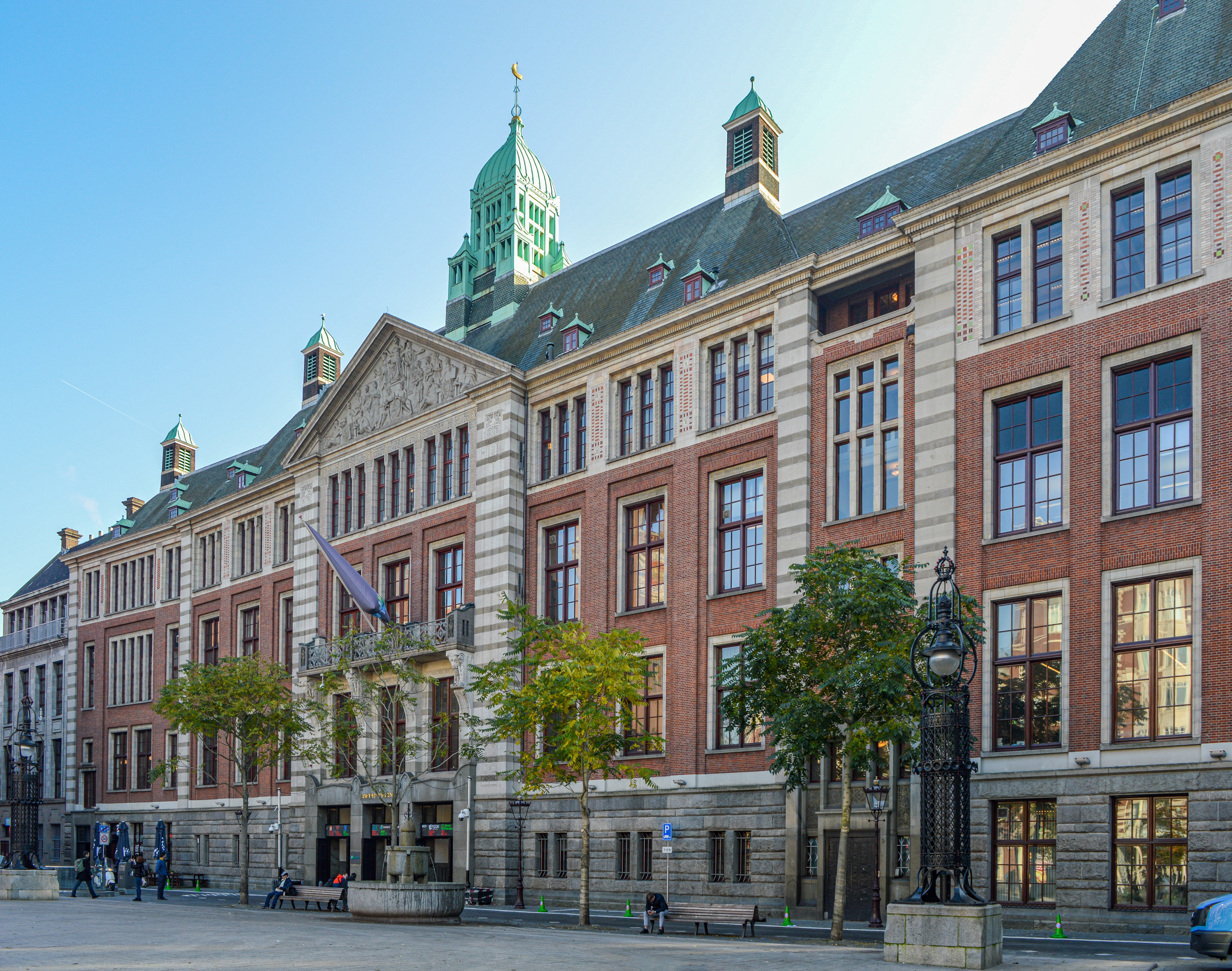
Dutch Stock Exchange, Amsterdam, the Netherlands. The Netherlands is the largest global Conduit OFC, and is the 5th largest global OFC, and the 4th largest shadow banking OFC.

=== Core definition ===
The definition of an offshore financial centre dates back to academic papers by Dufry & McGiddy (1978), and McCarthy (1979) regarding locations that are: Cities, areas or countries which have made a conscious effort to attract offshore banking business, i.e., non-resident foreign currency denominated business, by allowing relatively free entry and by adopting a flexible attitude where taxes, levies and regulation are concerned". An April 2007 review of the historical definition of an OFC by the IMF, summarised the 1978–2000 academic work regarding the attributes that define an OFC, into the following four main attributes, which still remain relevant:

1. Primary orientation towards non-residents;
2. Favourable regulatory environment;
3. Low or zero-taxation scheme;
4. Disproportion between the size of the financial sector and the domestic financing needs.

In April 2000, the term rose to prominence when the Financial Stability Forum ("FSF"), concerned about OFCs on global financial stability, produced a report listing 42 OFCs. The FSF used a qualitative approach to defining OFCs, noting that: Offshore financial centres (OFCs) are not easily defined, but they can be characterised as jurisdictions that attract a high level of non-resident activity [...] and volumes of non-resident business substantially exceeds the volume of domestic business.

In June 2000, the IMF accepted the FSF's recommendation to investigate the impact of OFCs on global financial stability. On 23 June 2000, the IMF published a working paper on OFCs which expanded the FSF list to 46 OFCs, but split into three Groups based on the level of cooperation and adherence to international standards by the OFC. The IMF paper categorised OFCs as a third type of financial centre, and listed them in order of importance: International Financial Centre ("IFC"), Regional Financial Centres ("RFC") and Offshore Financial Centres ("OFC"); and defined an OFC:

A more practical definition of an OFC is a center where the bulk of financial sector activity is offshore on both sides of the balance sheet, (that is the counterparties of the majority of financial institutions liabilities and assets are non-residents), where the transactions are initiated elsewhere, and where the majority of the institutions involved are controlled by non-residents

— IMF Background Paper: Offshore Financial Centres (June 2000)

The June 2000 IMF paper then listed three major attributes of offshore financial centres:

1. Jurisdictions that have relatively large numbers of financial institutions engaged primarily in business with non-residents; and
2. Financial systems with external assets and liabilities out of proportion to domestic financial intermediation designed to finance domestic economies; and
3. More popularly, centers which provide some of the following services: low or zero taxation; moderate or light financial regulation; banking secrecy and anonymity.

A subsequent April 2007 IMF on OFCs, established a quantitative approach to defining OFCs which the paper stated was captured by the following definition:

An OFC is a country or jurisdiction that provides financial services to nonresidents on a scale that is incommensurate with the size and the financing of its domestic economy.

— IMF Working Paper: Concept of Offshore Financial Centers: In Search of an Operational Definition (April 2007)

The April 2007 IMF paper used a quantitative proxy text for the above definition: More specifically, it can be considered that the ratio of net financial services exports to GDP could be an indicator of the OFC status of a country or jurisdiction. This approach produced a revised list of 22 OFCs,; however, the list had a strong correlation with the original list of 46 OFCs from the IMF's June 2000 paper. The revised list was much shorter than the original IMF list as it only focused on OFCs where the national economic accounts produced breakdowns of net financial services exports data.

By September 2007, the definition of an OFC from the most cited academic paper on OFCs, showed a strong correlation with the FSF–IMF definitions of an OFC:

Offshore financial centers (OFCs) are jurisdictions that oversee a disproportionate level of financial activity by non-residents.

— Andrew K. Rose, Mark M. Spiegel, "Offshore Financial Centers: Parasites or Symbionts?", The Economic Journal, (September 2007)

=== Link to tax havens ===
The common FSF–IMF–Academic definition of an OFC focused on the outcome of non-resident activity in a location (e.g. financial flows that are disproportionate to the local economy), and not on the reason that non-residents decide to conduct financial activity in a location. However, since the early academic papers on OFCs in the late 1970s, and the FSF-IMF investigations, it has been consistently noted that tax planning is only one of many drivers of OFC activity. Others include deal structuring and asset holding in a neutral jurisdiction with laws based on English common law, favourable/tailored regulation (e.g. investment funds), or regulatory arbitrage, such as in OFCs like Liberia, that focus on shipping.

In April–June 2000, when the FSF–IMF produced lists of OFCs, activist groups highlighted the similarity with their tax haven lists. Large projects were carried out by the IMF and the OECD from 2000 onwards, to improve data transparency and compliance with international standards and regulations, in jurisdictions that had been labeled OFCs and/or tax havens by the IMF–OECD. The reduction in banking secrecy, was partially credited to these projects as well as global advances in combatting illicit finance flows, and Anti-Money Laundering legislation and regulations. Academics who study tax havens and OFCs are now able to distinguish between those jurisdictions which are used in BEPS activity, and those which are simply tax-neutral, pass-through jurisdictions such as the Cayman Islands, British Virgin Islands and Bermuda.

Many leading OFCs have recently implemented recommended legislation to reduce or eliminate BEPS. Jurisdictions such as the Cayman Islands, British Virgin Islands and Bermuda found that over 90% of their business companies were out of scope because their core industry does not cater to BEPS strategies.

=== Conduit and Sink OFCs ===
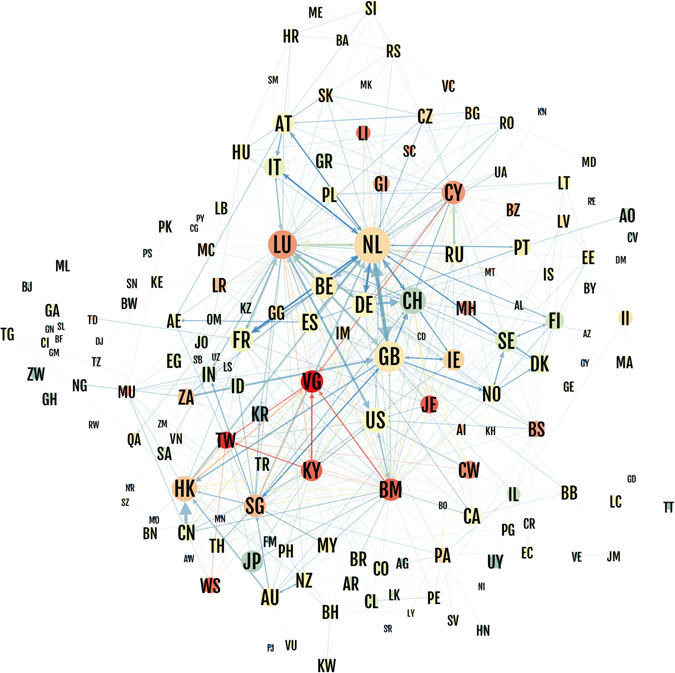
Uncovering Offshore Financial Centers: CORPNET's network of global connections split into Conduit OFCs and Sink OFCs.

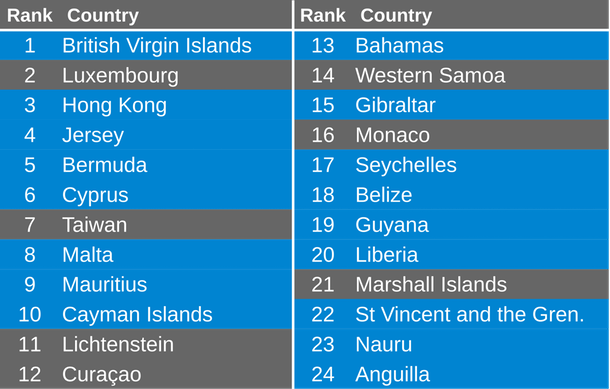
List of Sink OFCs ordered by scale (showing U.K. dependencies)

While from 2010 onwards, some researchers began to treat tax havens and OFCs as practically synonymous, the OECD and the EU went in a different direction depending on their desired outcome. By 2017, and after many years of regulatory changes in OFCs and some onshore IFCs, the OECD's list of "tax havens" only contained Trinidad & Tobago, which is not a prominent international financial centre. Signally, EU members are routinely not screened by activists including the EU itself. Oxfam, which has entities and activities in jurisdictions such as Lichtenstein, Luxembourg, Netherlands and Delaware, has become a prominent critic of OFCs and has produced reports with the Tax Justice Network, to try to depict their point of view. These are widely discredited by professionals and academics and prominent TJN leaders resigned complaining that the reports were not compiled by knowledgeable tax experts and were manufactured to present a desired outcome, which detracts from good faith efforts to curb BEPS, aggressive tax planning and illicit funds flows.

In July 2017, the University of Amsterdam's CORPNET group ignored any definition of a tax haven and followed a quantitive approach, analyzing 98 million global corporate connections on the Orbis database. CORPNET used a variation of the technique in the IMF's 2007 OFC working paper, and ranked the jurisdictions by the scale of international corporate connections relative to the connections from the local economy. In addition, CORPNET split the resulting OFCs into jurisdictions that acted like a terminus for corporate connections (a Sink), and jurisdictions that acted like nodes for corporate connections (a Conduit).

CORPNET's Conduit and Sink OFCs study split the understanding of an offshore financial centre into two classifications:

- 24 Sink OFCs: jurisdictions in which a disproportionate amount of value disappears from the economic system (e.g. the traditional tax havens).
- 5 Conduit OFCs: jurisdictions through which a disproportionate amount of value moves toward sink OFCs (e.g. the modern corporate tax havens)
  (Conduits are: Netherlands, United Kingdom, Switzerland, Singapore, and Ireland)

Sink OFCs rely on Conduit OFCs to reroute funds from high-tax locations using the BEPS tools which are encoded, and accepted, in the Conduit OFC's extensive networks of bilateral tax treaties. Because Sink OFCs are more closely associated with traditional tax havens, they tend to have more limited treaty networks.

CORPNET's lists of the top five Conduit OFCs, and top five Sink OFCs, matched 9 of the top 10 havens in the Hines 2010 tax haven list, only differing in the United Kingdom, which only transformed their tax code in 2009–12, from a "worldwide" corporate tax system, to a "territorial" corporate tax system.

Our findings debunk the myth of tax havens (Note: As discussed in the Definitions sections of tax havens, and of offshore financial centres, most tax academics consider the terms as being synonymous and use them inter-changeably) as exotic far-flung islands that are difficult, if not impossible, to regulate. Many offshore financial centers are highly developed countries with strong regulatory environments.

— Javier Garcia-Bernardo, Jan Fichtner, Frank W. Takes & Eelke M. Heemskerk, CORPNET University of Amsterdam

All of CORPNET's Conduit OFCs, and eight of CORPNET's top 10 Sink OFCs, appeared in the § IMF 2007 list of 22 OFCs. However, this theoretical work has been brought into question. Many of the "sink" jurisdictions by CORPNET's standards have proved to be conduit jurisdictions. When Economic Substance legislation was brought in, practically all of the companies in places like the Cayman Islands and the British Virgin Islands were out of scope because BEPS is not a relevant industry in those jurisdictions. Those jurisdictions concentrate more on investment funds, which are self-evidently conduit vehicles where investors are not taxed in the OFC but in full where they are tax resident.

== Lists ==
=== FSF–IMF 2000 list ===
The following 46 OFCs are from the June 2007 IMF background paper that used a qualitative approach to identify OFCs; and which also incorporated the April 2000 FSF list which also used a qualitative approach to identify 42 OFCs.

IMF Group I*
1. Guernsey
2. Hong Kong
3. Ireland
4. Isle of Man
5. Jersey
6. Luxembourg
7. Singapore
8. Switzerland

IMF Group II*

1. Andorra
2. Bahrain
3. Barbados
4. Bermuda
5. Gibraltar
6. Macau
7. Malaysia (Labuan)
8. Malta
9. Monaco

IMF Group III*

1. Anguilla
2. Antigua and Barbuda
3. Aruba
4. Bahamas
5. Belize
6. British Virgin Islands
7. Cayman Islands
8. Cook Islands
9. Costa Rica
10. Cyprus
11. Dominica‡
12. Grenada‡
13. Lebanon
14. Liechtenstein
15. Marshall Islands
16. Mauritius
17. Montserrat‡
18. Nauru
19. Netherlands Antilles
20. Niue
21. Panama
22. Palau‡
23. Samoa
24. Seychelles
25. St. Kitts and Nevis
26. St. Lucia
27. St. Vincent and the Grenadines
28. Turks and Caicos Islands
29. Vanuatu

(*) Groups are as per the IMF June 2000 categories:

1. Group I: generally viewed as cooperative, with a high quality of supervision, which largely adhere to international standards;
2. Group II: generally seen as having procedures for supervision and co-operation in place, but where actual performance falls below international standards, and there is substantial room for improvement;
3. Group III: generally seen as having a low quality of supervision, and/or being non-cooperative with onshore supervisors, and with little or no attempt being made to adhere to international standards.

(‡) Dominica, Grenada, Montserrat and Palau were not on the FSF April 2000 list of 42 OFCs but were on the IMF June 2000 list of 46 OFCs.

=== IMF 2007 list ===
The following 22 OFCs are from an April 2007 IMF working paper that used a strictly quantitative approach to identifying OFCs (only where specific data was available).

1. Bahamas†
2. Bahrain†
3. Barbados†
4. Bermuda† (Top 10 Sink OFC)
5. Cayman Islands† (Top 10 Sink OFC)
6. Cyprus† (Top 10 Sink OFC)
7. Guernsey†
8. Hong Kong† (Top 10 Sink OFC)
9. Ireland† (Top 5 Conduit OFC)
10. Isle of Man†
11. Jersey† (Top 10 Sink OFC)
12. Latvia
13. Luxembourg† (Top 10 Sink OFC)
14. Malta† (Top 10 Sink OFC)
15. Mauritius† (Top 10 Sink OFC)
16. Netherlands† (Top 5 Conduit OFC)
17. Panama†
18. Singapore† (Top 5 Conduit OFC)
19. Switzerland† (Top 5 Conduit OFC)
20. United Kingdom (Top 5 Conduit OFC)
21. Uruguay
22. Vanuatu†

(†) In on both the April 2000 FSF list of 42 OFCs, and the June 2000 IMF list of 46 OFCs.
(Top 5 Conduit OFC) The IMF list contains all 5 largest Conduit OFCs: Netherlands, United Kingdom, Switzerland, Singapore and Ireland
(Top 10 Sink OFC) The IMF list contains 8 of the 10 largest Sink OFCs: missing British Virgin Islands (data was not available), and Taiwan (was not a major OFC in 2007).

=== IMF 2018 list ===
The following eight OFCs (also called pass-through economies) were co-identified by an IMF working paper, as being responsible for 85% of the world's investment in structured vehicles.

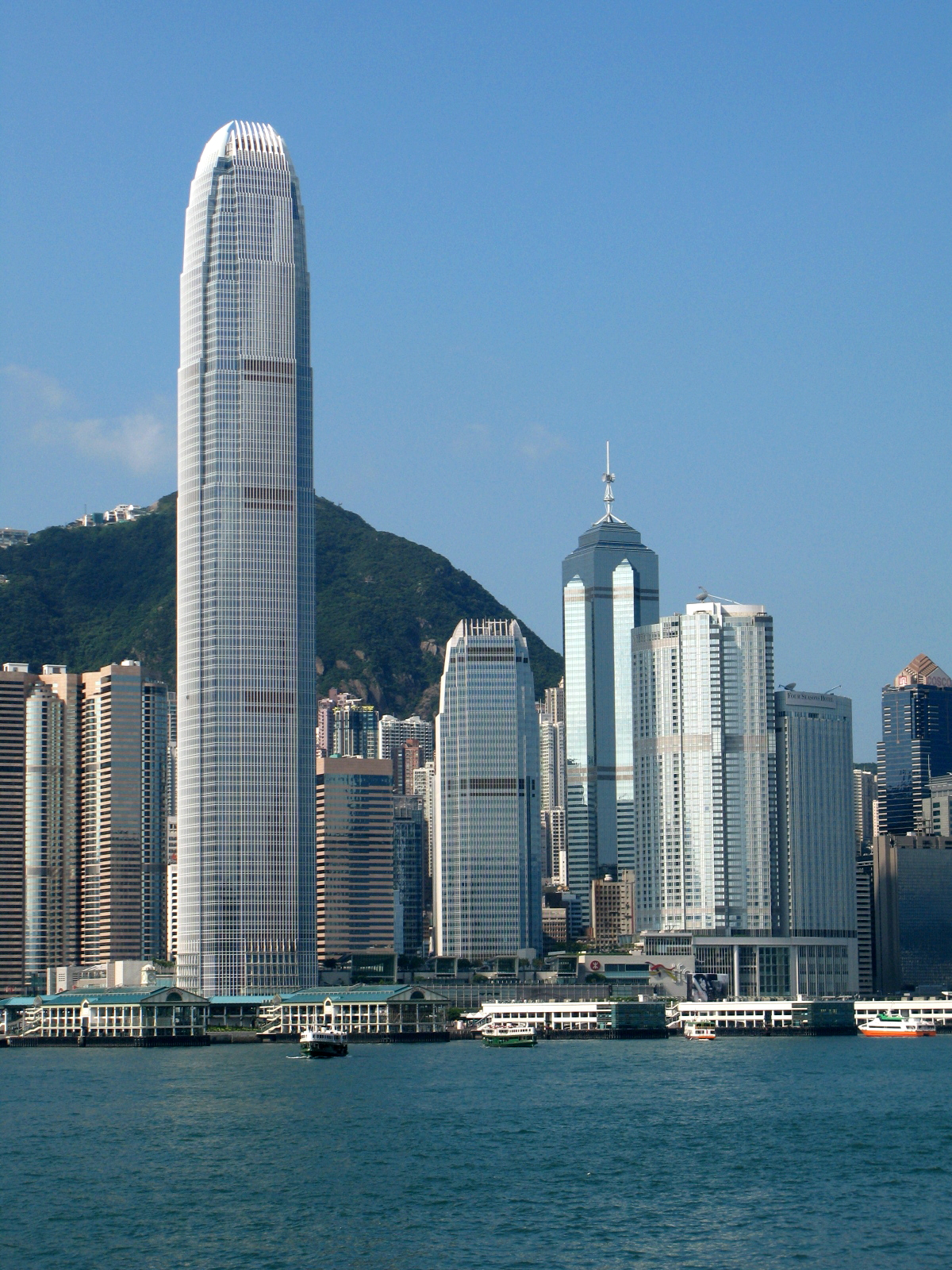
International Finance Centre, Hong Kong. Hong Kong is the third largest Sink OFC, and is the eighth largest global tax haven.

Comparison of the IMF 2018 eight major pass-through OFCs, with other OFC rankings (as discussed elsewhere in this article):
IMF Major OFC (alphabetical)	Conduit Sink OFC Ranking	Global Tax Haven BEPS Ranking	Global Shadow Bank OFI Ranking
Bermuda†	Top 5 Sink OFC	9	n.a. (Note: Does not provide the Financial Stability Forum with sufficient economic data to be included in their tables of OFIs)
British Virgin Islands	Top 5 Sink OFC	2	n.a.
Cayman Islands†	Top 10 Sink OFC	2	1
Hong Kong†	Top 5 Sink OFC	8	5
Ireland†	Top 5 Conduit OFC	1	3
Luxembourg†	Top 5 Sink OFC	6	2
Netherlands†	Top 5 Conduit OFC	5	4
Singapore†	Top 5 Conduit OFC	3	8

(†) In the April 2000 FSF list of 42 OFCs, the June 2000 IMF list of 46 OFCs, and the April 2007 IMF list of 22 OFCs.
(Top 5 Conduit OFC) The IMF list contains three of the largest Conduit OFCs: Netherlands, Singapore and Ireland
(Top 5 Sink OFC) The IMF list contains four of the five largest Sink OFCs: missing Jersey (fourth largest Sink OFC), but includes the Cayman Islands (tenth largest Sink OFC).

=== FSF 2018 Shadow Bank OFC list ===
Shadow banking is a key service line for OFCs. The Financial Stability Forum ("FSF") produces a report each year on Global Shadow Banking, or other financial intermediaries ("OFI"s). (Note: The FSF loosely defines other financial intermediaries as shadow banking; they are more specifically defined by the FSF as: "OFIs comprise all financial institutions that are not central banks, banks, insurance corporations, pension funds, public financial institutions, or financial auxiliaries") In a similar method to the various IMF lists, the FSF produces a table of the locations with the highest concentration of OFI/shadow banking financial assets, versus domestic GDP, in its 2018 report, thus creating a ranked table of "Shadow Banking OFCs". The fuller table is produced in the § Shadow banking section, however, the 4 largest OFCs for shadow banking with OFI assets over 5x GDP are:

1. Cayman Islands (Top 10 Sink OFC) OFI assets were 2,118 x GDP
2. Luxembourg (Top 5 Sink OFC) OFI assets were 246 x GDP
3. Ireland (Top 5 Conduit OFC) OFI assets were 13 x GDP (Note: A flaw in the FSF report is that they use Irish GDP, instead of Irish GNI*, as Irish GDP is overstated by circa 60%)
4. Netherlands (Top 5 Conduit OFC) OFI assets were 8.6 x GDP

== Countermeasures ==
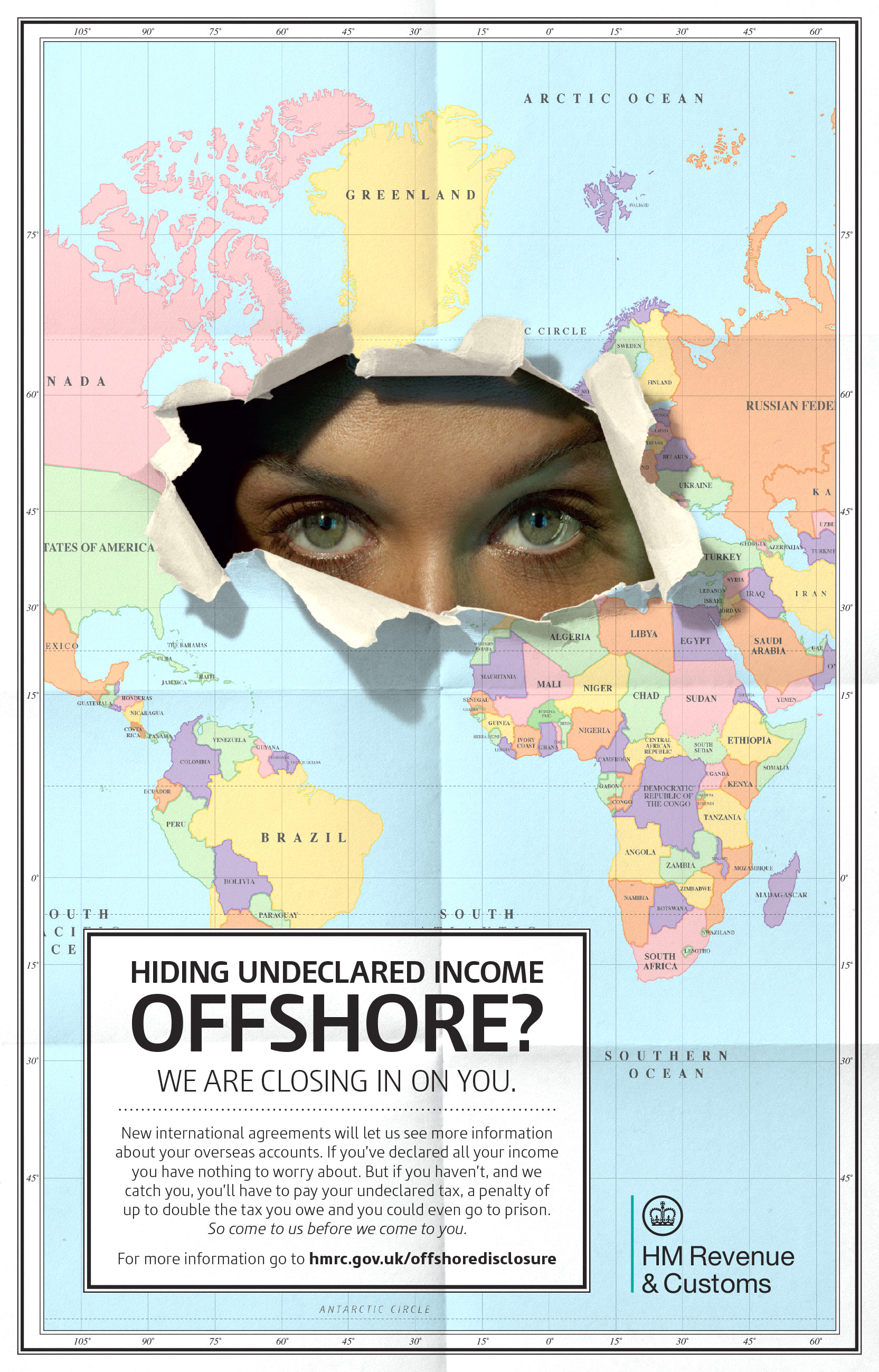
HM Revenue and Customs offshore evasion poster, February 2014

Offshore finance became the subject of increased attention since the FSF–IMF reports on OFC in 2000, and also from the April 2009 G20 meeting, during the height of the financial crisis, when heads of state resolved to "take action" against non-cooperative jurisdictions. Initiatives spearheaded by the Organisation for Economic Co-operation and Development (OECD), the Financial Action Task Force on Money Laundering (FATF) and the International Monetary Fund have had an effect on curbing some excesses in the offshore financial centre industry, although it would drive the OFC industry towards a § Focus on tax for institutional and corporate clients. The World Bank's 2019 World Development Report on the future of work supports increased government efforts to curb tax avoidance.

1. Money laundering. In 2000 the FATF began a policy of assessing the cooperation of all countries in programmes against money laundering. Considerable tightening up of both regulation and implementation was noted by the FATF over subsequent years (see generally FATF Blacklist). Most of the principal OFCs strengthened their internal regulations relating to money laundering and criminal financial activities.
2. Tax avoidance. Similarly, in 2000 the OECD began a policy of forcing greater compliance by traditional tax havens by increasing the requirements for data sharing and transparency to avoid being included on the OECD's tax haven blacklist. While objections from the U.S. limited the OECD's effect on tax havens, the increased information disclosure enabled tax academics to use more quantitative methods for identifying tax avoidance.
3. Financial and banking secrecy. The April 2000 FSF OFC report, which launched the June 2000 IMF OFC initiative, led to a process of increased data disclosure and financial reporting by financial institutions in OFCs. It also led to more specific clampdowns in the area of bank secrecy, over which the IMF have greater control, and which ultimately removed much of the main distinctions between historical definitions of OFCs and tax havens.

== Tax services ==
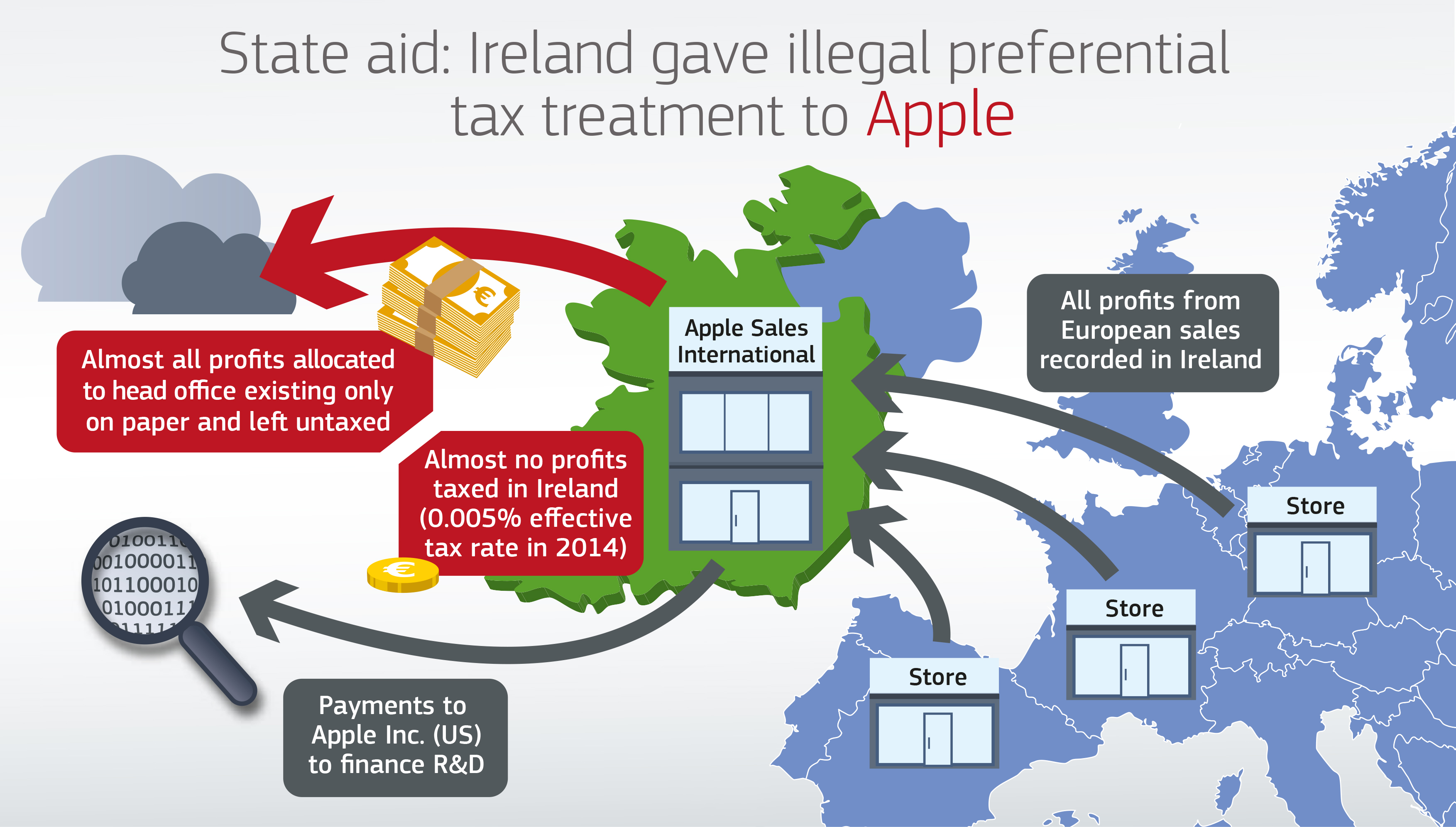
EU Commission's outline of Apple's hybrid–double Irish BEPS tax structure in Ireland, which used two branches inside a single company based on private rulings from the Irish Revenue Commissioners in 1991 and 2007

Early research on offshore financial centers, from 1978 to 2000, identified reasons for nonresidents using an OFC, over the financial system in their own home jurisdiction (which in most cases was more developed than the OFC). Prominent reasons in these lists were:

1. Low taxation (Dufey and Giddy (1978); McCarthy (1979); Johnston (1982); Park (1994); Errico and Musalem (1999))
2. Favourable regulations (Dufey and Giddy (1978); McCarthy (1979); Johnston (1982); Errico and Musalem (1999))
3. Manage around currency and capital controls (Johnston (1982); Park (1994); IMF (1995); Hampton (1996))

The third reason, Manage around currency and capital controls, dissipated with the globalisation of financial markets and free-floating exchange rate mechanisms, and ceases to appear in research after 2000. The second reason, Favourable regulations, had also dissipated, but to a lesser degree, as a result of initiatives by the IMF–OECD–FATF post–2000, promoting common standards and regulatory compliance across OFCs and tax havens. For example, while the EU–28 contains some of the largest OFCs (e.g. Ireland and Luxembourg), these EU–OFCs cannot offer regulatory environments that differ from other EU–28 jurisdictions.

These earlier regimes are no longer relevant in today's World. OFCs each tend to have one or more core business areas which dominate their industries. Substantially, but not exclusively, Cayman and the BVI are investment funds jurisdictions, as well as structured finance and holding company vehicles for large assets (such as infrastructure, commercial real estate), or SPVs for investment into jurisdictions with less certain legal and judicial infrastructure, such as China, Russia or India. Bermuda has a large reinsurance industry and Cayman's insurance industry is also now competitive.

In August 2013, Gabriel Zucman showed OFCs housed up to 8–10% of global wealth in tax–neutral (Note: Tax-neutral is a term that OFCs use to describe legal structures where the OFC does not levy any taxes, duties or VAT on fund flows into, during, or exiting (e.g. no withholding taxes) the vehicle. Major examples are the Irish Qualifying investor alternative investment fund (QIAIF), and the Cayman Islands SPC.) structures. Often conflated are the reasons why private equity funds and hedge funds are set up in OFCs, such as Delaware, the Cayman Islands, the British Virgin Islands, and Luxembourg, and which the Investment Manager often sets up there as well. The former is to benefit from investment funds-specific legislation designed for larger institutional, sovereign, High Net Worth or Development/NGO investors who are presumed to either be sophisticated in themselves or have access to sophisticated advice on account of their size. In this way, these funds are not open to retail investors who are normally investors in jurisdictions that cater for greater investor protection. The zero tax rate, as in many onshore funds, is so that the profits are taxed in the countries where the investors who earned the profits are tax resident. Any tax that was levied on the fund itself would have to be deducted from the onshore tax on those profits so that the same profit is not taxed twice.

On the other hand, the investment manager is often set up in low-tax OFCs to facilitate the personal tax planning of the manager.

In August 2014, Zucman showed OFCs being used by U.S. multinationals, in particular, to execute base erosion and profit shifting ("BEPS") transactions to avoid corporate taxes. Zucman's work is widely quoted yet also frequently criticised as being confused and counterfactual.

Demonstrating that most BEPS activity occurs in US and EU IFCs, in Q1 2015, Apple executed the largest BEPS transaction in history, moving US$300 billion in intellectual property ("IP") assets to Ireland, an IMF OFC, to use the Irish "Green Jersey" BEPS tool (see "Leprechaun economics"). In August 2016, the EU Commission levied the largest tax fine in history, at US$13 billion, against Apple in Ireland for abuse of the double Irish BEPS tool from 2004 to 2014. In January 2017, the OECD estimated that BEPS tools, mostly located in OFCs, were responsible for US$100 to 240 billion in annual tax avoidance. However, it is notable that developing countries often suffer from kleptocracy and serious corruption regarding national wealth, and BEPS is very much a secondary concern.

In June 2018, Gabriel Zucman (et alia) produced a report stating that OFC corporate BEPs tools were responsible for over US$200 billion in annual corporate tax losses, and produced the table (see below) of the largest BEPS locations in the world, which showed how synonymous the largest tax havens, the largest Conduit and Sink OFCs, and the largest § IMF 2007 list of OFCs had become.

In June 2018, another joint IMF study showed that 8 pass-through economies, namely, the Netherlands, Luxembourg, Hong Kong SAR, the British Virgin Islands, Bermuda, the Cayman Islands, Ireland, and Singapore; host more than 85 per cent of the world's investment in special purpose entities. It is important that these entities are tax-neutral because any taxation at the OFC entity would have an equivalent reduction in the home or investor countries.

Sources: Missing Profits of Nations. Appendix: Table 2 Shifted Profits: Country-by-Country Estimates (2015)
Zucman Tax Haven	Rank by Profit Shifted	Corporate Profits ($bn)			Profits Shifted ($bn)	Effective Tax Rate (%)	Corp. Tax Gain/Loss (%)
Zucman Tax Haven	Rank by Profit Shifted	Total	Local	Foreign	Profits Shifted ($bn)	Effective Tax Rate (%)	Corp. Tax Gain/Loss (%)
Ireland*†Δ⹋	1	174	58	116	-106	4%	58%
Caribbean*‡Δ⹋	2	102	4	98	-97	2%	100%
Singapore*†Δ⹋	3	120	30	90	-70	8%	41%
Switzerland*†Δ	4	95	35	60	-58	21%	20%
Netherlands*†Δ⹋	5	195	106	89	-57	10%	32%
Luxembourg*Δ⹋	6	91	40	51	-47	3%	50%
Puerto Rico	7	53	10	43	-42	3%	79%
Hong Kong*‡Δ⹋	8	95	45	50	-39	18%	33%
Bermuda*‡Δ⹋	9	25	1	25	-24	0%	n.a
Belgium	10	80	48	32	-13	19%	16%
MaltaΔ	11	14	1	13	-12	5%	90%
All others	12				-51		

(*) One of the largest 10 tax havens by James R. Hines Jr. in 2010 (the Hines 2010 List).
(†) Identified as one of the 5 Conduits (Ireland, Singapore, Switzerland, the Netherlands, and the United Kingdom), by CORPNET in 2017.
(‡) Identified as one of the largest 5 Sinks (British Virgin Islands, Luxemburg, Hong Kong, Jersey, Bermuda), by CORPNET in 2017.
(Δ) Identified on the § IMF 2007 list of 22 OFCs (note the IMF could not get sufficient data on The British Virgin Islands in 2007 for its study but did list the Cayman Islands).
(⹋) Identified on the § IMF 2018 list of 8 major OFCs, or pass-through economies (note the Caribbean contains the British Virgin Islands and the Cayman Islands).

== Finance services ==
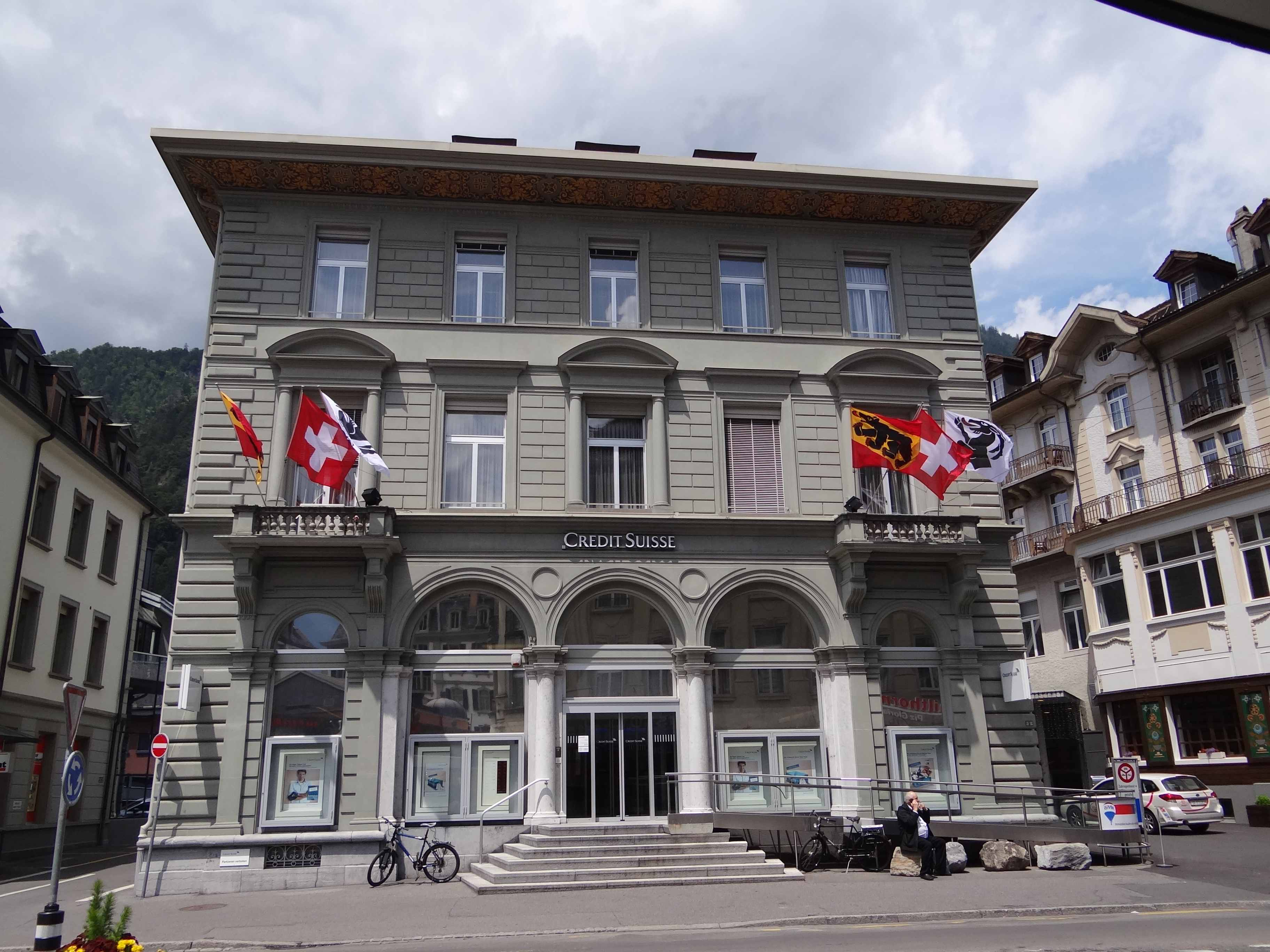
Banking secrecy in Switzerland is federally protected by the Banking Law of 1934.

=== Shadow banking ===
Research into OFCs highlighted shadow banking as an original service of OFCs. Shadow banking enabled pools of offshore capital, mostly dollars, that had escaped capital controls in the 1960s and 1970s, and thus the main onshore banking systems, to be recycled back into the economic system while paying interest to the capital's owner, thus encouraging them to keep their capital offshore. They highlight the Eurodollar capital market as particularly important. However, as OFCs developed in the 1980s, it became apparent that OFC banks were not just recycling Eurodollars from foreign corporate transactions, but also capital from tax avoidance (e.g. money being hidden in tax havens), and also from other criminal and illegal sources. Many OFCs, such as Switzerland, had bank secrecy laws protecting the identity of the owners of the offshore capital in the OFC. Over the years, a § Regulatory clampdown has weakened the ability of OFCs to provide bank secrecy. Shadow banking, however, remains a key part of OFCs services, and the Financial Stability Forum list of major shadow banking locations are all recognized OFCs.

Several jurisdictions included in this Report had OFI [shadow banking institution] sectors that were quite large compared to the size of their domestic economy: OFI assets were 2,118 times GDP in the Cayman Islands, 246 times GDP in Luxembourg, 13 times GDP in Ireland, and 8.6 times GDP in the Netherlands. No other jurisdictions exceeded 5 times GDP for this measure.

— Financial Stability Forum, "Global Shadow Banking and Monitoring Report: 2017" p. 17 (5 March 2018),

Financial assets all shown as % of GDP Source: Composition of Financial Systems (Advanced economies) Figure 2–3 Left (Page. 13): (where Total Financial Assets % of 2016 GDP is over 900%):
Location	Banks	OFI (Shadow Bank)	Insurance & Pension	Public sector	Central Bank	Total
Cayman Islands	34,171	211,844	1,900	21	5	247,941
Luxembourg	1,414	24,675	342		371	26,803
Irish Republic	215	1,333	142	31	31	1,751
Netherlands	319	855	263		42	1,480
Hong Kong	829	77	134	2	145	1,188
United Kingdom	591	309	211		27	1,138
Switzerland	376	283	205		113	977
Singapore	613	99	140		89	942

=== Securitisation ===
OFCs, however, have expanded into a related area to shadow banking, which is asset securitisation. Unlike traditional shadow banking, where the OFC bank needs to access a pool of offshore capital to operate, securitisation involves no provision of capital. OFC securitisation involves the provision of legal structures, registered in the OFC, into which foreign capital is placed to finance foreign assets (e.g. aircraft, ships, mortgages assets etc.), used by foreign operators and foreign investors. The OFC thus behaves more like a legal conduit rather than providing actual banking services. This has seen a rise in large specialist legal and accounting firms, that provide the legal structures for securitisations, in OFC locations. In normal securitisations, the foreign capital, assets and operators can all come from major onshore locations. For example, Deutsche Bank in Germany might lend Euro 5 billion into an Irish Section 110 SPV (the Irish securitisation legal structure), which then buys Euro 5 billion in aircraft engines from Boeing, and then leases the engines to Delta Air Lines. The reason why Deutsche Bank would use an Irish Section 110 SPV is that it is tax neutral, and that it has certain legal features, particularly orphaning, which are helpful to Deutsche Bank, but which are not available in Germany. Orphaning poses considerable risks of tax abuse and tax avoidance to the tax base of higher-tax jurisdictions; even Ireland discovered a major domestic tax avoidance scheme in 2016, by U.S. distressed debt funds, using the Irish Section 110 SPVs, on Irish domestic investments.

== Defences ==
=== Better regulations ===
OFCs have more recently become leaders in regulation, operating under higher standards than onshore jurisdictions, and having advanced legal systems with sophisticated commercial courts and arbitration centres. Because OFCs are willing to create legal structures for broad classes of assets, including investment funds, intellectual property ("IP") assets, cryptocurrency assets, and carbon credit assets, there is a justification that OFCs often seek to be at the forefront of certain types of regulation. Many OFCs have verified beneficial ownership and director registers, which while not yet public, put those OFCs at the forefront of global anti-money laundering regulation. When the UK, USA and EU issued sanctions against certain Russian people, assets and companies, those which were held in OFCs with verified KYC documentation assisted greatly in identifying ownership trails - something that would not necessarily have been possible if European jurisdictions, Delaware or English entities had been used. The fact that the OFCs' registers were not public did not detract from this exercise. Industry experts suspect that illicit commerce or those likely to risk sanctions are more likely to use lesser-regulated jurisdictions, making future sanctions projects much more difficult or impossible.

In certain situations, the costs of regulation and operation in OFCs can be lower than in the onshore financial centres. However, often the contrary is true owing to rising compliance, regulatory and legal costs. Some OFCs advertise fast approval times, perhaps 24 hours, for approval of new legal structures and special purpose vehicles, or only a few weeks for a mutual fund, however many onshore OFCs with negligible KYC requirements, such as the UK and Delaware, often offer same-day services.

=== Securitisation transactions ===
One of the most important service lines for OFCs is in providing legal structures for global securitisation transactions for all types of asset classes, including aircraft finance, shipping finance, equipment finance, and collateralised loan vehicles. OFCs provide what are called tax neutral special purpose vehicles ("SPVs") where no taxes, VAT, levies or duties are taken by the OFC on the SPV. In addition, aggressive legal structuring, including Orphan structures, is facilitated to support requirements for Bankruptcy remoteness, which would not be allowed in larger financial centres, as it could damage the local tax base, but is needed by banks in securitisations. As the effective tax rate in most OFCs is near zero (e.g. they are tax havens), this is a lower risk, although, the experience of U.S. distressed debt funds abusing Irish Section 110 SPVs in 2012–2016 is notable. However, OFCs play a key role in providing the legal structure for global securitisation transactions that could not be performed from the main financial centres.

=== Promotion of growth ===
The most controversial claim is that OFCs promote global economic growth by providing a preferred platform, even if due to tax avoidance or regulatory arbitrage reasons, from which global capital is more readily deployed. There are strong academic advocates, and studies, on both sides of this argument. Some of the most cited researchers into tax havens/offshore financial centres, including Hines, Dharmapala and Desai show evidence that, in certain cases, tax havens/OFCs, appear to promote economic growth in neighbouring higher-tax countries, and can solve issues that the higher-tax countries can have in their own tax or regulatory systems, which deter capital investment.

Tax havens (Note: From 2010, Hines stated in Treasure Islands that: "Tax havens are also known as 'offshore financial centres' or 'international financial centers', phrases that may carry slightly different connotations but nevertheless are used almost interchangeably with 'tax havens'.") change the nature of tax competition among other countries, very possibly permitting them to sustain high domestic tax rates that are effectively mitigated for mobile international investors whose transactions are routed through tax havens. [..] In fact, countries that lie close to tax havens have exhibited more rapid real income growth than have those further away, possibly in part as a result of financial flows and their market effects.

— James R. Hines Jr., "Treasure Islands" p. 107 (2010)

The most cited paper specifically on OFCs, also came to a similar conclusion (although recognising that there are strong negatives as well):

CONCLUSION: Using both bilateral and multilateral samples, we find empirically that successful offshore financial centers encourage bad behaviour in source countries since they facilitate tax evasion and money laundering [...] Nevertheless, offshore financial centers created to facilitate undesirable activities can still have unintended positive consequences. [...] We tentatively conclude that OFCs are better characterized as "symbionts".

— Andrew K. Rose, Mark M. Spiegel, "Offshore Financial Centers: Parasites or Symbionts?", The Economic Journal, (September 2007)

However, other major tax academics take the opposite view and accuse Hines (and others) of mixing cause and effect (e.g. the capital investment would have come through the normal taxed channels had the OFC option not been available), and included papers by Slemrod, and Zucman. Critics of this theory also point to studies showing that in many cases, the capital that is invested into the high-tax economy via the OFC, actually originated from the high-tax economy, and for example, that the largest source of FDI into the U.K., is from the U.K., but via OFCs.

This claim can get into wider, and also contested, economic debates around the optimised rate of taxation on capital and other free-market theories, as expressed by Hines in 2011.

== Structures ==
=== Legal structures ===
The bedrock of most offshore financial centres is the formation of offshore legal structures (also called tax-free legal wrappers):

- Asset holding vehicles: Many corporate conglomerates employ a large number of holding companies, and often high-risk assets are parked in separate companies to prevent legal risk accruing to the main group (i.e. where the assets relate to asbestos, see the English case of Adams v Cape Industries). Similarly, it is quite common for fleets of ships to be separately owned by separate offshore companies to try to circumvent laws relating to group liability under certain environmental legislation.
- Asset protection: Wealthy individuals who live in politically unstable countries utilise offshore companies to hold family wealth to avoid potential expropriation or exchange control restrictions in the country in which they live. These structures work best when the wealth is foreign-earned, or has been expatriated over a significant period of time (aggregating annual exchange control allowances).
- Avoidance of forced heirship provisions: Many countries from France to Saudi Arabia (and the U.S. state of Louisiana) continue to employ forced heirship provisions in their succession law, limiting the testator's freedom to distribute assets upon death. By placing assets into an offshore company, and then having probate for the shares in the offshore determined by the laws of the offshore jurisdiction (usually in accordance with a specific will or codicil sworn for that purpose), the testator can sometimes avoid such strictures.
- Collective Investment Vehicles: Mutual funds, Hedge funds, unit trusts and SICAVs are formed offshore to facilitate international distribution. By being domiciled in a low tax jurisdiction investors only have to consider the tax implications of their own domicile or residency.
- Derivatives and securities trading: Wealthy individuals often form offshore vehicles to engage in risky investments, such as derivatives and global securities trading, which may be extremely difficult to engage in directly onshore due to cumbersome financial markets regulation.
- Exchange control trading vehicles: In countries where there is either exchange control or is perceived to be increased political risk with the repatriation of funds, major exporters often form trading vehicles in offshore companies so that the sales from exports can be "parked" in the offshore vehicle until needed for further investment. Trading vehicles of this nature have been criticised in a number of shareholder lawsuits which allege that by manipulating the ownership of the trading vehicle, majority shareholders can illegally avoid paying minority shareholders their fair share of trading profits.

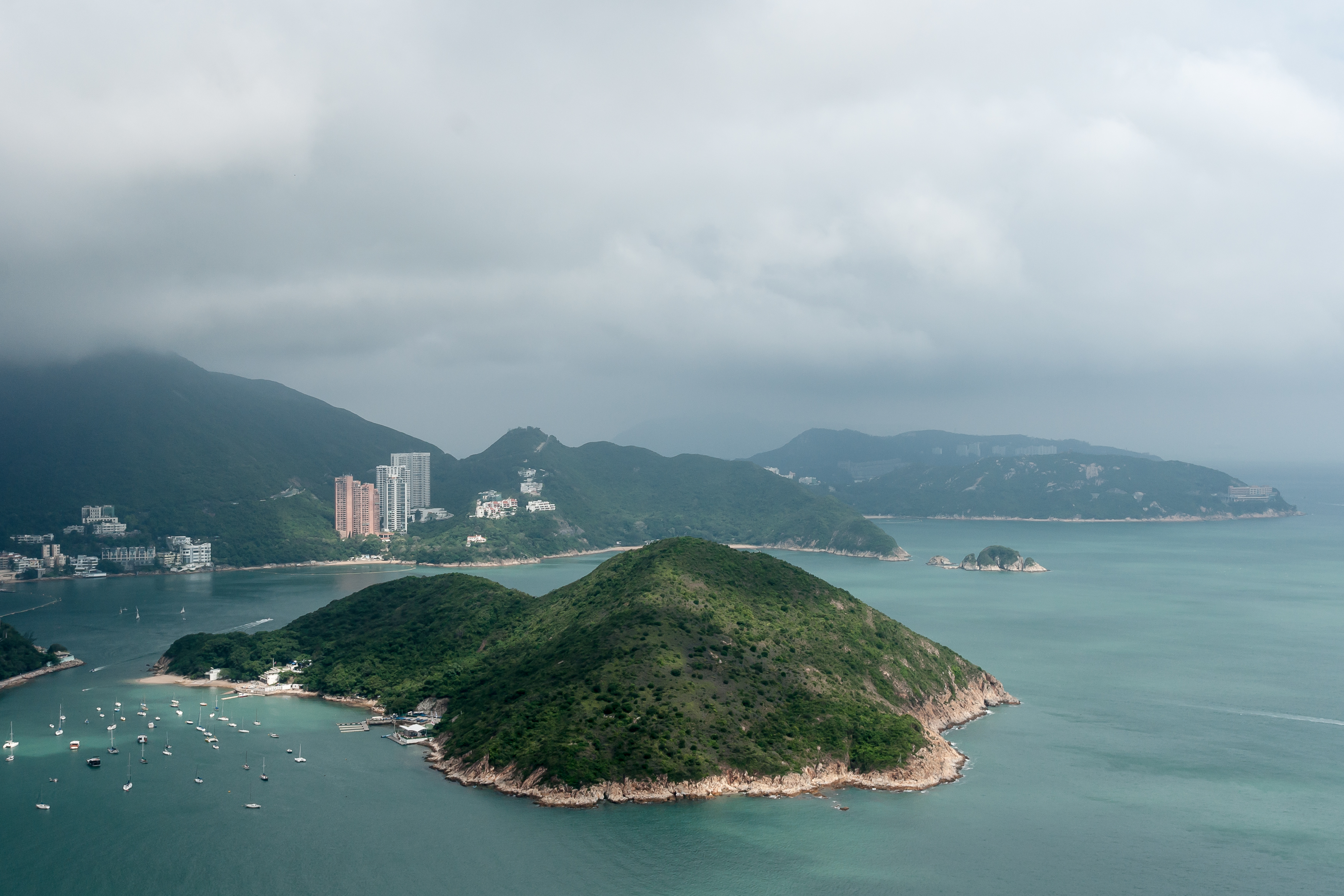
Hong Kong is frequently a financial center for corporate structuring.

- Joint venture vehicles: Offshore jurisdictions are frequently used to set up joint venture companies, either as a compromise neutral jurisdiction (see for example, TNK-BP) and/or because the jurisdiction where the joint venture has its commercial centre has insufficiently sophisticated corporate and commercial laws.
- Stock market listing vehicles: Successful companies who are unable to obtain a stock market listing because of the underdevelopment of the corporate law in their home country often transfer shares into an offshore vehicle, and list the offshore vehicle. Offshore vehicles are listed on the NASDAQ, Alternative Investment Market, the Hong Kong Stock Exchange and the Singapore Stock Exchange.
- Trade finance vehicles: Large corporate groups often form offshore companies, sometimes under an orphan structure to enable them to obtain financing (either from bond issues or by way of a syndicated loan) and to treat the financing as "off-balance-sheet" under applicable accounting procedures. In relation to bond issues, offshore special purpose vehicles are often used in relation to asset-backed securities transactions (particularly securitisations).
- Creditor avoidance: Highly indebted persons may seek to escape the effect of bankruptcy by transferring cash and assets into an anonymous offshore company.
- Market manipulation: The Enron and Parmalat scandals demonstrated how companies could form offshore vehicles in part of their structures to manipulate financial results.
- Tax evasion: Although numbers are difficult to ascertain, some individuals and corporations unlawfully evade tax by not declaring gains made by onshore and offshore vehicles that they own. Tax reporting regulations and agreements are now in place which aid authorities in investigating and prosecuting such criminality. Multinationals including GlaxoSmithKline and Sony have previously been accused of transferring profits from the higher-tax jurisdictions in which they are made to zero-tax offshore centres. BEPS-focussed regulations make this activity more difficult.

=== Ship and aircraft registrations ===
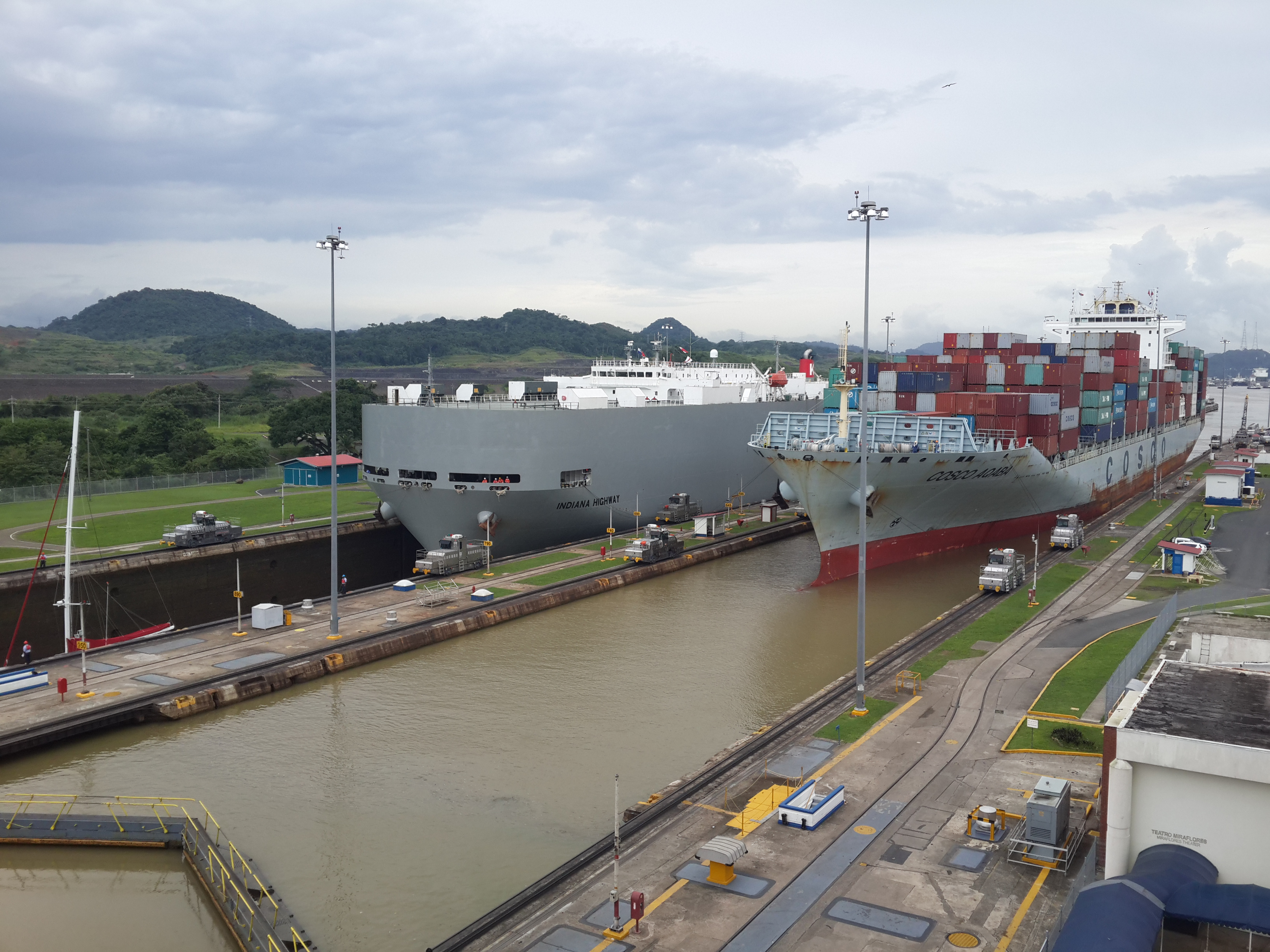
Commercial ships register in Central American states to avoid scrutiny from foreign countries. Pictured: a large carrier ship docking in Panama.

Many offshore financial centres also provide registrations for ships (notably Bahamas and Panama) or aircraft (notably Aruba, Bermuda and the Cayman Islands). Aircraft are frequently registered in offshore jurisdictions where they are leased or purchased by carriers in emerging markets but financed by banks in major onshore financial centres. The financing institution is reluctant to allow the aircraft to be registered in the carrier's home country (either because it does not have sufficient regulation governing civil aviation, or because it feels the courts in that country would not cooperate fully if it needed to enforce any security interest over the aircraft), and the carrier is reluctant to have the aircraft registered in the financier's jurisdiction (often the United States or the United Kingdom) either because of personal or political reasons, or because they fear spurious lawsuits and potential arrest of the aircraft.

For example, in 2003, state carrier Pakistan International Airlines re-registered its entire fleet in the Cayman Islands as part of the financing of its purchase of eight new Boeing 777s; the U.S. bank refused to allow the aircraft to remain registered in Pakistan, and the airline refused to have the aircraft registered in the United States.

=== Insurance ===
A number of offshore jurisdictions promote the incorporation of captive insurance companies within the jurisdiction to allow the sponsor to manage risk. In more sophisticated offshore insurance markets, onshore insurance companies can also establish an offshore subsidiary in the jurisdiction to reinsure certain risks underwritten by the onshore parent, and thereby reduce overall reserve and capital requirements. Onshore reinsurance companies may also incorporate an offshore subsidiary to reinsure catastrophic risks.

Bermuda's insurance and reinsurance market is now the third largest in the world. There are also signs the primary insurance market is becoming increasingly focused upon Bermuda; in September 2006 Hiscox PLC, the FTSE 250 insurance company announced that it planned to relocate to Bermuda citing tax and regulatory advantages.

=== Collective investment vehicles ===
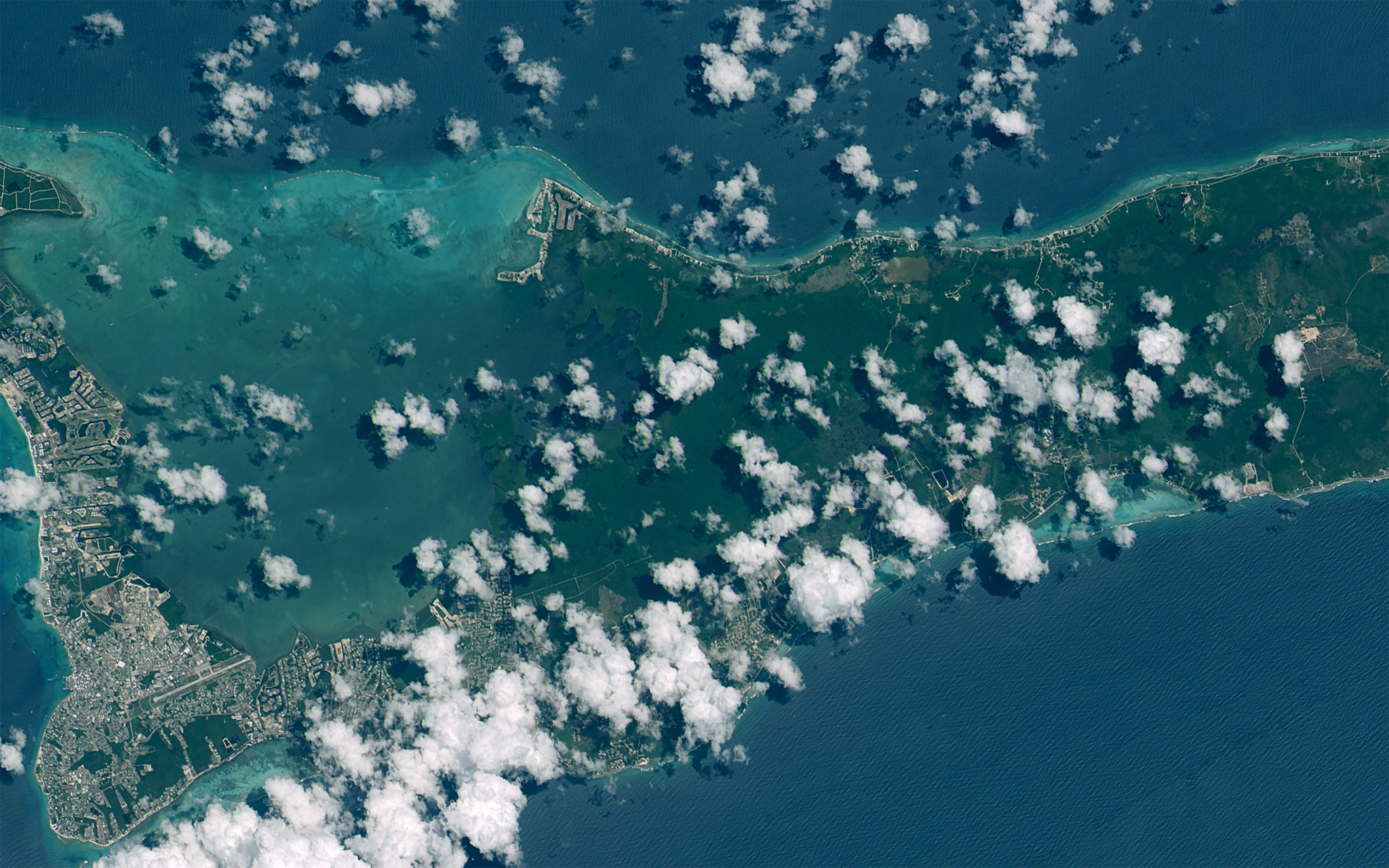
The Cayman Islands are the market leaders in offshore funding.

Many offshore jurisdictions specialise in the formation of collective investment schemes, or mutual funds. The market leader is the Cayman Islands. At year-end 2020, there were 24,591 funds registered with the Cayman Islands Monetary Authority (CIMA), including 583 Limited Investor Funds and 12,695 Private Funds. Total ending net asset value (NAV) increased to US$4.967 trillion from US$4.229 trillion in 2019 - excluding Limited Investor and Private Funds. At year-end 2020, total ending NAV for Limited Investor Funds submitting a FAR was US$107 billion and US$2.475 trillion for Private Funds. Worldwide there were 126,457 regulated open-ended funds with total net assets of US$63.1 trillion; 9,027 mutual funds with an ending NAV of US$29.3 trillion in the United States and 57,753 funds with an ending NAV of US$21.8 trillion in Europe.

However the greater appeal of offshore jurisdictions to form mutual funds is usually in the regulatory considerations. As offshore jurisdictions do not tend to cater to small retail investors, they tend to impose fewer if any restrictions on what investment strategy the mutual funds may pursue and no limitations on the amount of leverage which mutual funds can employ in their investment strategy. Many offshore jurisdictions (Bermuda, British Virgin Islands, Cayman Islands and Guernsey) allow promoters to incorporate segregated portfolio companies (or SPCs) for use as mutual funds; the complexity of incorporating a similar corporate vehicle onshore alongside other onshore company regimes has resulted in sophisticated investor clients preferring the simplicity of offshore incorporated funds.

=== Banking ===
Traditionally, a number of offshore jurisdictions offered banking licences to institutions with relatively little scrutiny. International initiatives have largely stopped this practice, and very few offshore financial centres will now issue licences to offshore banks that do not already hold a banking licence in a major onshore jurisdiction. The most recent reliable figures for offshore banks indicate that the Cayman Islands has 285 licensed banks, the Bahamas has 301. By contrast, the British Virgin Islands only has seven licensed offshore banks.

== See also ==
- Corporate tax haven
- Financial centre
- Ireland as a tax haven
- Market manipulation
- Panama Papers
- Pandora Papers
- Paradise Papers
- Tax haven
- United States as a tax haven
