= Academic ranks in Canada =

Academic ranks in Canada are the titles, relative importance and power of professors, researchers, and administrative personnel held in academia.

== Faculty ==
In Canada, a distinction is generally made between college- and university-level higher education in Canada instructors along the lines of an institution's primary purpose – teaching or research, respectively.

=== Tenured and tenure-track positions ===
These full-time faculty members engage in teaching, research, and service. Only faculty members in these positions are eligible for tenure. In most research-intensive universities, research produced by the individual constitutes the majority of tenure consideration, and pre-tenure faculty have a reduced teaching load. In universities with less research focus, research and teaching may hold equal weight, or in some cases (such as for teaching-stream positions), teaching might be the only factor considered for tenure.

- Distinguished professor or university professor (if retired, distinguished professor emeritus, university professor emeritus; French: professeur distingué, professeure distinguée, professeur d’université, professeure d’université, professeur au niveau universitaire, professeure au niveau universitaire)
- Professor or full professor (if retired, professor emeritus; French: professeur titulaire, professeure titulaire)
- Associate professor (French: professeure agrégée, professeur agrégé)
- Assistant professor (French: professeur adjoint, professeure adjointe)
- Teaching stream (assistant professor, teaching stream; associate professor, teaching stream; and professor, teaching stream): These relatively new designations are used at only some institutions. The defining attribute of these designations is the high teaching requirement, in exchange for less research, and higher expectations for teaching quality in the tenure review process.

Educators who hold a formal title of "professor" (referred to as tenured/tenure-track faculty) typically begin their careers as assistant professors with subsequent promotions to the ranks of associate professor and finally professor. The titles are historical traditions; for example, it is not implied that an assistant professor "assists" more senior faculty. There is often a strict timeline for application for promotion from assistant to associate professor, most often five or six years following the initial appointment. Applicants are evaluated based on their contributions to research, teaching, and administration. The relative weightings of these contributions differ by institution, with PhD-granting universities usually placing more emphasis on research and liberal arts colleges placing more emphasis on teaching. The decision to grant tenure and promotion from assistant to associate professor usually requires numerous levels of approval, with a common sequence being:

1. external reviewers—several nationally or internationally prominent academics in the candidate's field will be asked to review the candidate's application for promotion and submit a confidential report
2. based on this report and evidence of the candidate's accomplishments in their curriculum vitae, a committee of members from the candidate's department will make a recommendation for tenure/promotion or denial of such
3. the department will vote
4. the department decision is communicated to a university panel of individuals from outside of the department who evaluate the application and decide whether they agree or disagree with the departmental recommendation
5. the dean
6. the board of governors, president or other upper level governing body

A decision to reject a candidate for tenure normally requires that the individual leave the institution within a year. Otherwise, tenure is granted along with promotion from assistant to associate professor. Although tenure and promotion are usually separate decisions, they are often highly correlated such that a decision to grant a promotion coincides with a decision in favour of tenure, and vice versa. Promotion to associate professor usually results in an increased administrative load and membership on committees that are restricted to tenured faculty.

Some people remain at the level of associate professor throughout their careers. However, most will apply for the final promotion to full professor; the timeline for making this application is more flexible than that for assistant to associate positions and the associate professor does not normally lose his or her job if the application is rejected. As with promotion from assistant to associate professor, promotion from associate to full professor involves review at multiple levels, similar to the earlier tenure/promotion review. This includes external reviews, decisions by the department, recommendations by members of other departments, and high-ranking university officials. Usually, this final promotion requires that the individual has maintained an active research program, and excellent teaching, in addition to taking a leadership role in important departmental and extra-departmental administrative tasks. Full professor is the highest rank that a professor can achieve (other than in a named position) and is seldom achieved before a person reaches their mid-40s. The rank of full professor carries additional administrative responsibilities associated with membership on committees that are restricted to full professors.

The top administrative post in many academic departments is the "department chair" (in multi-divisional faculties) and "director" (in single division faculties). Prior to the 1970s, such administrators were called "chairmen" or "chairwomen," but the term in most institutions has since been shortened to the gender-neutral "chair." While some department chairs also hold endowed chair positions, the two positions are distinct.

=== Contractually limited terms ===
- Teaching stream (assistant professor (conditional): short term teaching-intensive positions with reduced research responsibilities
- Research stream: teaching responsibilities are reduced, research funding and expectations are increased.

Temporary appointments

- Instructor (sessional lecturer or sessional instructor; French: chargée de cours, chargé de cours, instructeur, instructrice)

=== Non-tenure-track positions ===
Individuals in these positions typically (though not always) focus on teaching undergraduate or graduate courses (not necessarily both), are not given credit for any research they undertake (except in the case of "research professors"), and may or may not have administrative or service roles. In some cases, Lecturers and Teaching Professors can have almost equivalent job security as tenure track positions after going through a parallel process of review. The use of the unqualified title "professor" is used only in non-academic contexts to distinguish a person's role as different from that of a teacher at a high school and does not refer to any academic rank. The term "instructor" is very generic and can be applied to any teacher, or it can be a specific title (tenured or tenure-track) depending upon how an institution chooses to use the term.

- Professor of the practice or professor of professional practice: have commonly been reserved for practitioners who are appointed because of skills and expertise acquired in nonacademic careers and whose primary focus is teaching. This designation is bestowed on individuals who have achieved a distinguished career in a specific field of practice (engineering, management, business, law, medicine, architecture etc.), and will have a substantial basis of experience equal to a tenured professor (normally a minimum of 12 years) and a national/international reputation for excellence reflected in a record of significant accomplishments. Such appointments are also being offered to individuals with academic career backgrounds. These latter professors of practice are principally engaged in teaching and are not expected to be significantly involved in research activities.
- Teaching professor: A faculty member whose primary responsibilities are teaching and service rather than research. Historically these positions were called Lecturer and Senior Lecturer (see below). Recently some institutions rebranded such positions as "professor of teaching" or "teaching stream, assistant (or associate) professor". Similar titles are used for tenured, tenure-track and continuing positions with larger teaching to research ratio (see above).
- Adjunct professor, adjunct instructor or adjunct lecturer: Part-time, non-tenure-track faculty members. Adjunct professors are usually nominated in recognition of their research contributions and activities at the appointing institution and are appointed with nil salary. Adjunct instructors or adjunct lecturers are paid for each class they teach. When mainly involved in teaching, they are not always required to have a PhD degree. The minimum credentials usually constitute an academic or professional appointment at government, industry, or another institution (French: professeur associé, professeure associée, instructeur associé, instructeure associée, chargé de cours associé, chargée de cours associée).
- Lecturer or instructor: A full-time or part-time position at a university that does not involve tenure or formal research obligations (although sometimes they choose to perform research), but can often involve administrative service roles. This position does not necessarily require a doctoral degree and usually involves a focus on undergraduate or introductory courses. In some colleges the term Senior Lecturer is awarded to highly qualified or accomplished lecturers. A convention some schools have begun to use is the title "teaching professor," with or without ranks, to clarify that these are in fact true faculty members who simply do not have research obligations (French: chargée de cours, chargé de cours, instructeur, instructrice).
- Visiting professor (with ranks): (a) A temporary assistant/associate/full professor position (see above), e.g. to cover the teaching load of a faculty member on sabbatical. (b) A professor on leave who is invited to serve as a member of the faculty of another college or university for a limited period of time, often an academic year (French: professeur invité, professeure invitée, professeur visiteur, professeure visiteuse).
- Research professor: A position that usually carries only research duties with no obligation for teaching. Research professors usually have no salary commitment from their institution and must secure their salary from external funding sources such as grants and contracts. (These are often known as "soft money" positions.) Although research professor positions usually are not eligible to be awarded tenure, their ranks parallel those of tenure-track positions (like clinical professors): i.e., research assistant professor, research associate professor, and (full) research professor (French: professeur-chercheur, professeure-chercheuse).
- Teaching assistant (TA), graduate teaching assistant (GTA), course assistant (CA), teaching fellow (TF) or graduate student instructor (GSI): Positions typically held by graduate students. TAs play a supportive role involving grading, review sessions and labs. Teaching fellows (and at some universities, TAs or GSIs) teach entire courses (French: assistant à l’enseignement, assistante à l’enseignement, adjoint à l’enseignement, adjointe à l’enseignement, auxiliaire à l’enseignement).

=== Retired faculty ===
Retired faculty may retain formal or informal links with their university, such as library privileges or office space. At some institutions faculty who have retired after achieving the rank of professor are given the title "professor emeritus" (male, French: professeur émérite) or "professor emerita" (female, French: professeure émérite).

== Research personnel ==
- Research professor (see above)
- Senior fellow, senior research fellow or senior scientist (French: chercheur supérieur, chercheuse supérieure)
- Fellow, research fellow or scientist (French: chercheuse, chercheur)
- Research supervisor or principal investigator (French: directeur de recherche, directrice de recherche)
- Research associate or postdoctoral associate (French: associée de recherche, associé de recherche)
- Research assistant (French: auxiliaire de recherche)

== Administrative ranks ==
- Dean (often also full professors) is a title applied to overseers of groups of departments.
- Associate dean (often also full professors)
- Directors of administrative departments
- Associate/assistant directors of administrative departments
- Chairs of academic departments (usually full professors)
- Graduate coordinators
- Undergraduate coordinators

== College ranks ==
Faculty ranking systems vary from province to province. In Ontario, colleges usually include three faculty ranks: technician, instructor, professor. All ranks may be full- or part-time positions. College professors may or may not have undergraduate and graduate degrees, but they typically have professional certifications and experience that qualify them for the position. Additionally, college professors may propose and create curriculum, whereas instructors and technicians cannot. In departments that offer bachelor's degrees, provincial governments typically require that a minimum of half of the program faculty hold terminal degrees and be employed at the professor rank.

A variety of vice-presidential positions exist at the discretion of individual colleges.

Some colleges have specialized research units whose staff may be full- or part-time. Staff in these units go by a number of titles relevant to their work.

== See also ==
- Academic ranks (United States)
