= Visiting scholar =

Scholar who visits another university

In academia, a visiting scholar, visiting scientist, visiting researcher, visiting fellow, visiting lecturer, or visiting professor is a scholar from an institution who visits a host university to teach, lecture, or perform research on a topic for which the visitor is valued. In many cases, the position is not salaried because the visitor is salaried by their home institution (or partially salaried, as in some cases of sabbatical leave from US universities).

Typically, a visiting scholar may stay for a couple of months or even a year, though the stay can be extended. A visiting scholar is usually invited by the host institution, and it is not out of the ordinary for them to provide accommodation. Such an invitation is often regarded as recognizing the scholar's prominence in the field. Attracting prominent visiting scholars often allows the permanent faculty and graduate students to collaborate with prominent academics from other institutions, especially foreign ones.

In the UK, a visiting scholar or visiting academic usually has to pay a so-called bench fee (also called research support fee) to the university, which will give access to shared office space and other university facilities and resources (such as lab and associated supplies). Bench fees vary across UK universities.

The purpose of a visiting scholars program is generally to bring to the university or educational institution in question an exceptional senior scholar who can contribute to the community's intellectual and research endeavors and international projection. Hence, in addition to conducting their own research, visitors are often expected to participate in productive institutional activities, such as:

- Deliver a formal lecture to the hosting institution
- Engage in formal or informal discussions with graduate or postgraduate research students
- Undertake collaborative research with faculty or staff
- Present guest lectures or faculty seminars
- Present a paper as part of the university's seminar program

== See also ==
- Professor, for a visiting professor, more specifically also visiting professor in the U.S.
- Research fellow, for a visiting researcher
