= Professors in the United States =

U.S. academic ranks of assistant professor, associate professor, or professor

Professors in the United States commonly occupy any of several positions of teaching and research within a college or university. In the U.S., the word "professor" is often used to refer to anyone who teaches at a college or university level at any academic rank. This usage differs from the predominant usage of the word professor in other countries, where the unqualified word "professor" only refers to "full professors" (i.e., the highest rank among regular faculty), nor is it generally used in the United States for secondary education teachers. Other tenure-track faculty positions include assistant professor (entry level) and associate professor (mid-level). Other teaching-focused positions that use the term "professor" include Clinical Professor, Professor of Practice, and Teaching Professor (specific roles and status vary widely among institutions, but usually do not involve tenure). Most faculty with titles of "Lecturer" and "Instructor" in the U.S. are not eligible for tenure, though they are still often referred to as "professors" in a general sense and as a courtesy form of address. Non-tenure-track positions may be full or part time, although the qualifier "adjunct" always denotes part-time (whether combined with the word "professor" or not).

Research and teaching are among the main tasks of tenured and tenure-track professors, with the amount of time spent on research or teaching depending strongly on the type of institution. Publication of articles in conferences, journals, and books is essential to occupational advancement. In 2011, a survey conducted by TIAA-CREF Institute senior researcher Paul J. Yakoboski estimated that 73% of professors with senior tenure ranged between the ages of 60 and 66 and that the remaining 27% were above the age of 66. Yakoboski estimated that 75% of these professors have acknowledged that they have made no preparations for retirement due to the ongoing financial crisis and reluctance to leave their profession. A 2013 survey conducted by Fidelity Investments would echo similar results when the question about retirement came up.

In 2020, the National Center for Education Statistics counted 189,692 professors, 162,095 associate professors, 166,543 assistant professors, 96,627 instructors, 44,670 lecturers, and 164,720 other full-time faculty.

== Overview ==
The term "professors" in the United States refers to a group of educators at the college and university level. In the United States, while "Professor" as a proper noun often implies a position title officially bestowed by a university or college to faculty members with a PhD or the highest level terminal degree in a non-academic field (e.g., MFA, MLIS), the common noun "professor" is often used casually to refer to anyone teaching at the college level, regardless of rank or degree. At some junior colleges without a formal ranking system, instructors are accorded the courtesy title of "professor".

Although almost all tenured professors hold doctorates, some exceptional scholars without them are occasionally granted tenure: Jay Forrester (electrical engineering, M.I.T.) had only a master's degree; Saul Kripke (philosophy, Rockefeller) and Andrew Gleason (mathematics, Harvard) had only a bachelor's degree; Edward Fredkin (computer science, M.I.T.) and Erik Erikson (psychology, Harvard) did not even have bachelor's degrees. Tenure without a doctorate is somewhat more common in fields with an artistic component, as with Howard Nemerov (poetry, Washington University in St. Louis) and Colin Rowe (architectural history and theory, Cornell). Until the middle of the 20th century, professors without doctorates were more common.

=== Tenured and tenure-track positions ===
These full-time faculty members with PhDs or other highest-level terminal degrees (designated as acceptable by a university or college, including the "professional equivalent" to the doctorate at institutions such as Columbia University), engage in both undergraduate and graduate teaching, mentoring, research, and service. Only faculty in these positions are eligible for tenure.

- Assistant Professor: An introductory level professor. A position generally taken after receiving a PhD and often, especially in the sciences, completing a post-doctoral fellowship. After 7 years, in most American colleges and universities, a tenure-track faculty member (usually assistant professor) must be either awarded tenure, or dismissed from the university.
- Associate Professor: A mid-level, usually tenured, professor.
- Professor (sometimes referred to as "Full Professor"): a senior, tenured professor.
- Distinguished Professor or Endowed Chair (e.g., "the Brian S. Smith Professor of Physics"): An honorary position in which a full professor's salary may be increased, perhaps by being tied to an endowment derived from the university, private individuals, firms, or foundations.

The top administrative post in many academic departments is the "department chair." Prior to the 1970s, such administrators were called "chairmen" or "chairwomen", but the term in most institutions has since been the gender-neutral "chairperson", or shortened to "chair". While many department chairs also hold endowed chair positions, the two positions are distinct.

Educators who hold a formal title of "Professor" (referred to as tenured/tenure-track faculty) typically begin their careers as assistant professors (or "lecturers" and "senior lecturers"), with subsequent promotions to the ranks of associate professor and finally professor. The titles are historical traditions; for example, it is not implied that an assistant professor "assists" more senior faculty. There is often a strict timeline for application for promotion from assistant to associate professor, most often 5 or 6 years following the initial appointment. Applicants are evaluated based on their contributions to research, teaching, and administration. The relative weightings of these contributions differ by institution, with PhD-granting universities usually placing more emphasis on research and liberal arts colleges placing more emphasis on teaching. The decision to grant tenure and promotion from assistant to associate professor usually requires numerous levels of approval, with a common sequence being:

1. external reviewers—several nationally or internationally prominent academics in the candidate's field will be asked to review the candidate's application for promotion and submit a confidential report;
2. based on this report and evidence of the candidate's accomplishments in his or her curriculum vitae, a committee of members from the candidate's department will make a recommendation for tenure/promotion or denial of such;
3. the department will vote;
4. the department decision is communicated to a university panel of individuals from outside of the department who evaluate the application and decide whether they agree or disagree with the departmental recommendation;
5. the dean;
6. the board of governors/president or other upper level governing body.

A decision to reject a candidate for tenure normally requires that the individual leave the institution within two years (under the AAUP tenure guidelines). Otherwise, tenure is granted along with promotion from assistant to associate professor. Although tenure and promotion are usually separate decisions, they are often highly correlated such that a decision to grant a promotion coincides with a decision in favor of tenure, and vice versa. Promotion to associate professor usually results in an increased administrative load and membership on committees that are restricted to tenured faculty.

Some people remain at the level of associate professor throughout their careers. However, most will apply for the final promotion to full professor; the timeline for making this application is more flexible than that for assistant to associate positions and the associate professor does not normally lose his/her job if the application is rejected. As with promotion from assistant to associate professor, promotion from associate to full professor involves review at multiple levels, similar to the earlier tenure/promotion review. This includes external reviews, decisions by the department, recommendations by members of other departments, and high-ranking university officials. Usually, this final promotion requires that the individual has maintained an active research program and excellent teaching, in addition to taking a leadership role in important departmental and extra-departmental administrative tasks. Full professor is the highest rank that a professor can achieve (other than in a named position) and is seldom achieved before a person reaches their mid-40s. The rank of full professor carries additional administrative responsibilities associated with membership on committees that are restricted to full professors.

Two-year community colleges that award tenure often use the "professor" ranking system as well. Candidates for tenure at those institutions would not normally need to hold a PhD, only the degree necessary (usually a master's) for employment as an instructor.

=== Non-tenure-track positions ===
Individuals in these positions who typically (though not always) focus on teaching undergraduate courses do not engage in research (except in the case of "research professors"), may or may not have administrative or service roles, and sometimes are eligible for job security that is less strong than tenure. They may still be referred to casually as "professor" and be described by the common-noun "professor", whether or not they have been officially designated that position title by the university or college. Likewise, the term "instructor" is very generic and can be applied to any teacher, or it can be a specific title (tenure or tenure-track) depending upon how an institution chooses to use the term.

- Professor of (the) practice and professor of professional practice: have commonly been reserved for practitioners who are appointed because of skills and expertise acquired in nonacademic careers and whose primary focus is teaching. This designation is bestowed on individuals who have achieved a distinguished career in a specific field of practice (engineering, management, business, law, medicine, architecture etc.), and will have a substantial basis of experience equal to a tenured professor (normally a minimum of 12 years) and a national/international reputation for excellence reflected in a record of significant accomplishments. Such appointments are also being offered to individuals with academic career backgrounds. These latter professors of practice are principally engaged in teaching and are not expected to be significantly involved in research activities.
- Collegiate professor, teaching professor, or clinical professor (with or without ranks): More recent titles with many different variations, sometimes dependent upon rank; these instructors may hold parallel ranks as their tenure-track counterparts (i.e., teaching assistant professor, teaching associate professor, and (full) teaching professor) at institutions whose policy is to only provide "tenure" to those who do research. In professional fields where such positions typically involve a practical or skills-based emphasis (e.g., medicine, law, engineering), they may be titled as clinical professors (in medical fields), studio professors (in architecture and design), or industry professors (in fields such as engineering and technology). In the sense of being teaching-focused and without research obligations, there are similarities to "professors of practice."
- Lecturer/Instructor: A full- or part-time position at a college or university that usually does not involve tenure or formal research obligations (although sometimes they choose to perform research) but can often involve administrative service roles. When in a regular, long-term salaried position of at least some minimal appointment level (e.g., half-time), it may include voting and other privileges. This position often involves a focus on undergraduate and/or introductory courses, sometimes as a cost-savings measure due to the lower salaries compared to tenure-track positions. In some colleges, the term Senior Lecturer is used for highly qualified or accomplished lecturers. For permanent (or at least "career") faculty members in these roles, some institutions have been converting some or all of these positions to titles such as "teaching professor" to clarify that these are in fact true faculty members.
- Research professor (with or without ranks): A position that usually carries only research duties with no obligation for teaching. Research professors often have no salary commitment from their institution, and thus must secure their salary from external funding sources such as grants and contracts. (These are often known as "soft money" positions.) Accordingly, research professor positions usually are not eligible to be awarded tenure, but may still have ranks parallel to tenure-track counterparts (e.g., assistant, associate, and full levels).
- Instructional faculty (Assistant Professor of Instruction/Associate Professor of Instruction/Professor of Instruction) include professors holding part-time or full-time appointments, "who are primarily considered instructional personnel and may also have service responsibilities".

==== Positions typically temporary and/or part-time ====
- Adjunct faculty – professor/lecturer/instructional or sessional lecturer: Part-time, non-salaried faculty members who are paid for each particular class they teach. Most adjunct faculty (adjuncts) are hired as a lecturer or instructor. Originally, the title adjunct professor usually involved professionals employed elsewhere full-time, or retired professional academics, and their teaching may have had a professional practice emphasis.
- Visiting professor (with or without ranks): (a) A temporary assistant/associate/full professor position (see above), e.g., to cover the teaching load of a faculty member on sabbatical. (b) A professor on leave who is invited to serve as a member of the faculty of another college or university for a limited period of time, often an academic year.
- Student instructional positions (not "faculty" positions): Teaching assistant (TA), graduate teaching assistant (GTA), course assistant (CA), teaching fellow (TF), instructional student assistant (ISA), associate instructor or graduate student instructor (GSI). Positions typically held by graduate students. TAs play a supportive role involving grading, review sessions, and labs. Teaching fellows (and at some universities, TAs or GSIs) teach entire courses. In any event, these positions are notably not considered "faculty" positions, and never vote in faculty elections or serve on faculty committees, etc., even at institutions where part-time faculty may do so. Their teaching is considered part of their training as students at the university, and is generally under the supervision of a faculty member in some manner even when a faculty member is not directly involved with the course. See also: Teaching fellow#United States.

=== Retired faculty ===
Retired faculty may retain formal or informal links with their university, such as library privileges or office space. At some institutions, faculty who have retired after achieving the rank of professor are given the title "professor emeritus" (male) or "professor emerita" (female).

== Tenure-track faculty ranks ==
Although the term "professor" is often used to refer to any college or university teacher, there are different 'tiers' of professorship ranging from an entry-level position as an "assistant professor" to "full professor", a rank reserved for professors who have established themselves as experts within their academic fields. Contrary to some beliefs, assistant professors, associate professors, and full professors are all, in fact, technically professors. Usually students who have completed their doctoral studies seek positions as assistant professors in colleges and universities. As they progress in their established fields through research, teaching, and service, they can make bids for promotion and tenure, which typically elevates them to the rank of associate professor. Associate professors who continue to establish high profiles and become experts in their fields of study may bid for a promotion to full professor, which is considered an esteemed position reserved for the most successful professors working in their fields. College and university teachers who hold the rank of lecturer or instructor are typically not tenured/tenure-track faculty, usually focus on teaching undergraduate courses, and are generally not involved in research, nor are they typically involved in department and university decision-making. (Note that in other English-speaking countries, the term lecturer might have a different meaning. For example, in the United Kingdom and in Ireland, the position of lecturer is equivalent to that of assistant professor in the US system.)

=== Assistant professor ===
The rank of assistant professor generally is held for a probationary period of five to seven years, after which the individual will either be promoted to associate professor and granted tenure (i.e., cannot be fired without cause and a formal hearing process) or will be terminated from employment. As of 2007, 23.1% of academics held the rank of assistant professor.

Competition for assistant professor positions in many fields is rapidly growing; the number of PhD graduates is rising, while the number of assistant professor openings remains roughly constant. The opposite is true, however, in business disciplines, where the anticipated shortfall of business faculty may reach 2,400 openings by 2012. The U.S. Occupation Outlook Handbook notes that a significant proportion of any growth in academic professor jobs will be due to "part-time and non tenure-track positions". As of 2003, the average age at which scientists received tenure in the United States was 39, which can make it difficult for professors to balance professional and family obligations.

==== The tenure process ====
After several years at the rank of assistant professor, individuals are considered for a promotion and tenure. Tenure generally constitutes a lifetime employment agreement and could also serve as a means of protecting faculty whose research may be socially, politically, or scientifically controversial. Rates for achieving tenure vary, depending on the institutions and areas of study; in most places at least 50% of assistant professors will eventually become tenured and promoted to associate professors; however, this number can be as low as 10% in natural sciences departments of top universities or in non-PhD-granting schools. In unusual circumstances, it is possible to receive tenure but to remain as an assistant professor, typically when tenure is awarded early.

=== Associate professor ===
Upon successfully receiving tenure, an assistant professor usually is promoted to the rank of associate professor. The mid-level position is usually awarded after a substantial record of scholarly accomplishment (such as the publication of one or more books, numerous research articles, a successful program of external research grant support, successful teaching, and/or service to the department); however, the specific requirements vary considerably between institutions and departments. As of 2007, 22.4% of academics hold the rank of associate professor.

Alternatively, a person may be hired at the associate professor level without tenure (which is a typical practice at some universities, often done as a financial inducement to attract someone from outside the institution, but who might not yet meet all the qualifications for tenure). If an applicant is appointed to the rank of associate professor without tenure, the position is usually tenure-track with an expectation that the person will soon qualify for tenure.

At some institutions, individuals are promoted to the rank of associate professor prior to receiving tenure. In these situations, the individual may eventually apply for tenure at that institution or, optionally, seek a tenured position elsewhere.

=== Professor ===
Upon a sustained and distinguished track record of scholarly achievement within one's university and academic discipline, an associate professor may be promoted to professor (sometimes referred to as "full professor"). In most traditional colleges and universities, this position is always tenured; however, this may not be the case in a for-profit private institution or certain church-affiliated universities and colleges.

The rank of professor is the highest of the standard academic ranks in the United States, and is held by 29.5% of U.S. academics. Advancement past the rank of professor typically involves administrative duties (e.g., department chair, dean, or provost) or selection for an honorary title or endowed chair.

The absence of a mandatory retirement age contributes to "graying" of this occupation. The median age of American full professors (in 2006) was around 55 years. Very few people attain this position before the age of 40. The annual salary of full professors averages at $99,000, although less so at non-doctoral institutions, and more so at private doctoral institutions (not including side income from grants and consulting, which can be substantial in some fields); in addition, institutions in major cities or high cost of living areas will pay higher salaries.

In addition to increasing salary, each promotional step also tends to come with increased administrative responsibilities. In some cases, these changes are offset by reduced teaching or research expectations.

== Special academic ranks (tenured) ==
=== Professor emeritus and emerita ===
A full professor who retires in good standing may be referred to as a professor emeritus for men, or professor emerita for women. This title is also given to retired professors who continue to teach and to be listed. The title may also be given to full professors who have left for another institution but are still working full-time. The concept has in some places been expanded to include also tenured associate professors, or also non-tenure-track faculty. In some systems and institutions the rank is bestowed on all professors who have retired in good standing, while at others it needs a special act or vote. Depending on local circumstances, professors emeriti may retain office space or other privileges.

The word is typically used as a postpositional adjective ("professor emeritus") but can also be used as a preposition adjective ("emeritus professor"). There is a third, somewhat less common usage, following the full title (e.g., "professor of medicine, emeritus".)

=== Distinguished (research/teaching) professor ===
Often specific to one institution, titles such as "president's professor", "university professor", "distinguished professor", "distinguished research professor", "distinguished teaching professor", "distinguished university professor", or "regents professor" are granted to a small percentage of the top tenured faculty who are regarded as particularly important in their respective fields of research. Some institutions grant more university-specific, formal titles such as M.I.T.'s "Institute Professor", Yale University's "Sterling Professor", or Duke University's "James B. Duke Professor".

Some academic and/or scholarly organizations may also bestow the title "distinguished professor" in recognition of achievement over the course of an academic career. For example, the Association of Collegiate Schools of Architecture annually recognizes up to five faculty at architecture schools in the United States and Canada with the ACSA Distinguished Professor Award.

=== Named/endowed chair ===
The incumbent of a "named chair" or "endowed chair" is a professor who holds a specific position within a university system, typically department chair that is financially supported by an investment portfolio (i.e., an endowment) initially created by donated funds from a firm, person, or group of persons. Endowed chairs are typically named for the person or entity who donated these funds, or for a person whom the funds were donated in honor of, such as a distinguished emeritus professor at that institution. Endowed chairs are best classified as a position rather than a career rank, because professors of different ranks could hold such a chair. Investment income earned from the chair's endowment is typically used to supplement the professor's salary, to provide a yearly budget that can be used to support the professor's research activities, or both.

== Other designations ==
For non-tenure track teaching positions in the US, academic institutions use a wide array of different job titles depending on if the position is temporary or permanent, if the work is full-time or part-time, and numerous other factors. Adding to the confusion over the formal names of non-tenure track positions, in almost every case the common-noun descriptor "professor" is used informally for people who teach at a college or university, regardless of their formal job title, and the terms are often loosely interchanged by faculty and administrators. For example, US President Barack Obama is commonly referred to as having been a professor of law at the University of Chicago, when in fact he formally held the title of senior lecturer, causing some controversy during the 2008 US Presidential Election. The faculty of the University of Chicago Law School eventually published a statement noting that it is common for lecturers to be referred to as professors, and that they support the use of the term professor to describe Obama's role with the university.

=== Lecturer/instructor ===
"Lecturers" and "instructors" in the US can work full-time or part-time and may be referred to as "professor" by their classes, but they often don't mind when students refer to them as college teachers, so they are technically teachers, but in a college setting. This is especially common at community colleges and teaching universities, in which teaching is their top priority. Since these positions are usually not tenured, they often are not obligated to do research in their fields, although many of them do publish, research, and consult. Alternatively, at US medical colleges, the title "Instructor" can be given to someone who is full-time faculty and who may conduct research with no teaching obligation. These appointments can be tenured in some universities.

=== Visiting professor ===
An individual hired with a college or university to teach for a limited time is sometimes referred to as a "visiting professor" or "visiting lecturer"; this may be someone who is a professor elsewhere, or a scholar or practitioner who is not. The term may also refer simply to non-tenure track teaching appointments (usually 1 to 3 years) and/or post-doctorate research appointments. The title can mirror the naming conventions used in tenure-track positions, for example the professor in question could be called a "Visiting Assistant Professor", "Distinguished Visiting Professor", etc.

=== Adjunct professor ===
An adjunct professor is a professor who does not hold a permanent or full-time position at that particular academic institution. Adjunct professors usually have no expectation of tenure as a part of their contract. An adjunct is generally not required to participate in the administrative responsibilities at the institution expected of tenure-track professors, nor are adjuncts paid for their research.

Traditionally the majority of adjuncts held full-time jobs outside academia, while still having relevant qualifications for teaching, and taught one or two classes in their respective fields of expertise to provide a practical perspective to the often theoretical coursework taught by full-time professors. In some cases, an adjunct may hold one of the standard academic ranks in another department, and be recognized with adjunct rank for making contributions to the department in question. Thus, one could be an "associate professor of physics and adjunct professor of chemistry". In some universities, there are different ranks of adjunct faculty. For example, at the University of Iowa, the ranks are adjunct instructor, adjunct assistant professor, adjunct associate professor, and adjunct full professor; the University states that "the expectations at each rank are similar to those for the same rank on the tenure track".

Since the 1990s, the nature of adjunct professorship in the United States and other nations has shifted for some adjunct professors and institutions to refer mainly to persons hired to teach courses on a short-term contractual basis. Such adjuncts generally have a teaching load below the minimum required to earn employment benefits such as health insurance or access to retirement accounts. In contrast with tenure-track professors, adjuncts do not usually have individual offices or a place to store possessions.

Adjuncts are not funded to maintain currency in their fields of expertise, nor to interact with students other than within the course(s) they are hired to teach. Often, adjuncts will work for several universities simultaneously, as working at one school often fails to provide adequate income to support oneself. These adjuncts have been called part of the "working poor". In 2014, a national news story described the situation of adjuncts as "Juggling multiple part-time jobs, earning little-to-no benefits, depending on public assistance: This is the financial reality for many adjunct professors across the nation." In 2015, an adjunct professor of law writing in The Guardian provided an anecdotal example of the low pay some adjuncts earn: teaching five courses with a gross salary of $15,000 for the year, less than a professional pet sitter.

Universities often treat adjuncts as inexpensive and replaceable when compared to tenure-track faculty, and as additional teaching resources to be called up as necessary. Adjuncts cannot count on employment: classes can be transferred from adjuncts to full-time professors, classes with low enrollment can be summarily canceled; and the teaching schedule from one semester to the next can be unpredictable.

In response, adjuncts at some universities and college have unionized and organized strikes, such as those at The New School and University of California campuses.Adjunct faculty unions often focus on job security, pay increases, and combating course cancellations.

=== Professor by courtesy / courtesy professor / affiliated professor ===
A professor who is primarily and originally associated with one academic department, but has become officially associated with a second department, institute, or program within the university and has assumed a professor's duty in that second department as well, could be called a "courtesy professor" or "professor by courtesy." Example: "Dan Jurafsky is professor of linguistics and professor by courtesy of computer science at Stanford University". Usually, the second courtesy appointment carries with it fewer responsibilities and fewer benefits than a single full appointment (for example, affiliated professors rarely have voting rights in their courtesy department).

=== Research professor ===
A professor who does not take on all of the classic duties of a professor, but instead focuses on research. At most universities, research professors are not eligible for tenure and must fund their salary entirely through research grants, with no regular salary commitment from internal university sources. In parallel with tenure-track faculty ranks, there are assistant and associate research professor positions.

=== Assistant, associate or full teaching professors ===
These types of professors focus on teaching, often at higher loads than research faculty, and in departments with graduate students, supervising teaching assistants. They may be ranked assistant, associate, and full. At some institutions (like within the University of California system), these are full voting members of the Academic Senate who get tenured and promoted in the same manner as other tenure-track faculty, and have all the powers/rights of other faculty at the same rank (e.g. Principal investigator status, supervising doctoral dissertations, serving in academic leadership roles, etc.).

At some institutions, they may be full-time contingent instructors who are not required to meet the research requirements of the tenure track.

=== Clinical professor ===
A clinical professor engages in practical instruction (of professional students) typically with an emphasis on practical skills as opposed to theory. This generally is not a "tenure track" position, but can be either full- or part-time. These types of appointments are common in law, medicine, and business schools, and are sometimes referred to as 'professor of practice'.

=== Honorary professor ===
This is a title normally granted to those who have contributed significantly to the school and community (for example, by donation for furtherance of research and academic development), but may or may not have earned a PhD.

== Demographics ==
Most professors in the U.S. are male, liberal (in the contemporary American political sense), and upper middle class. A slight majority of professors ranked among the top 15% of wage earners, in 2005.

According to a study by Robert Lichter, a professor at George Mason University, "The vast majority of professors in the United States identify themselves as liberal, and registered Democrats commonly outnumber registered Republicans." However, this demographic tendency varies across departments. A 2010 study by Gross and Fosse found that the political persuasions of American professors had changed over the 20th century. In the 1800s professors were often clergymen and tended towards conservatism, gradually becoming more liberal with the Progressive Era and Great Depression. By the mid-20th century, the humanities and social sciences were dominated by liberal or Democratic professors, with Republicans or conservatives showing a slight majority in departments of business, agriculture and engineering. From the late 1970s to the mid 1980s there was a trend towards conservatism amongst professors (paralleling a national shift to the right with the "Reagan Revolution"): about 5% of professors identified themselves as strongly left-wing, about a third identifying themselves as liberals, about 25% identifying themselves as moderates, 25% as conservative, and 5% as strongly conservative. Since the 1980s, the percentage of liberal professors has grown steadily, with nationwide research consistently finding somewhere between 7 and 9 liberals for each professor of another political persuasion.

In terms of education, the vast majority of professors hold doctorate degrees. Professors at community colleges may only have a master's degree while those at four-year institutions are often required to hold a doctorate or other terminal degree. To some extent this is a result of "credential creep": why hire someone without a doctorate, since there are so many applicants with one? Older faculty, hired when doctorates were less common, are less likely to hold the degree.

== Salary ==
Most of the full-time tenured or tenure-track professors are paid by a college or university on nine- or ten-month contracts. Salary data for professors is typically reported as a nine-month salary, not including compensation received (often from research grants) during the summer. In 2006, the overall median 9-month salary for all professors in the U.S. was reported to be $73,000, placing a slight majority of professors among the top 15% of earners at age 25 or older. Yet, their salaries remain considerably below that of some other comparable professions (even when including summer compensation) such as lawyers (who earned a median of $110,000) and physicians (whose median earnings ranged from $137,000 to $322,000 depending on speciality). According to the U.S. Department of Labor,

[Academic year 2007] salaries for full-time faculty in the U.S. averaged $73,207. By rank, the average was $98,974 for professors, $69,911 for associate professors, $58,662 for assistant professors, $42,609 for instructors, and $48,289 for lecturers. Faculty in 4-year institutions earn higher salaries, on average, than do those in 2-year schools. In 2006–2007, faculty salaries averaged $84,249 in private independent institutions, $71,362 in public institutions, and $66,118 in religiously affiliated private colleges and universities.

Salaries vary widely by field and rank, ranging from $45,927 for an assistant professor in theology to $136,634 for a full professor in legal professions and studies. A 2005 study by the College and University Professional Association for Human Resources found the average salary for all faculty members, including instructors, to be $66,407, placing half of all faculty members in the top 15.3% of income earners above the age of 25. Median salaries were $54,000 for assistant professors, $64,000 for associate professors and $86,000 for full professors 2005. During the 2005–2006 year, salaries for assistant professors ranged from $45,927 in theology to $81,005 in law. For associate professors, salaries ranged from $56,943 in theology to $98,530 in law, while salaries among full professors ranged from $68,214 in theology to $136,634 in law. During the 2010–2011 year, associate professor salaries vary from $59,593 in theology to $93,767 in law. Full professors at elite institutions commonly enjoy six-figure incomes, such as $123,300 at UCLA or $148,500 at Stanford. The CSU system, which is the largest system in the U.S., with over 11,000 faculty members, had an average full-time faculty salary of $74,000 in 2007, which had been scheduled to increase to $91,000 by 2011. Unfortunately for these faculty, the ensuing crash of the U.S. economy resulted in temporary pay reductions and total salary stagnation at the 2007 level instead, in spite of ongoing inflation.

Adjunct faculty make from $1,500 to $4,000 per course, so that if teaching four courses per semester – a schedule difficult to maintain for reasons of distance and market saturation, and a higher teaching load than tenure-track faculty usually endure – they can earn from $12,000 to $32,000 per year.

The following table uses figures for the 2005–2006 academic year:

Rank	Lowest median by field	Highest median by field	Overall median	Common range	Common salary range in relation to labor force	
Rank	Lowest median by field	Highest median by field	Overall median	Common range	Full-time, age 25+	All earners age 25+
Assistant professor	$45,927	$81,005	$58,662	Low 50s – Low 60s	70th to 75th percentile	77th to 83rd percentile
Associate professor	$56,943	$98,530	$69,911	Low 60s – High 70s	75th to 86th percentile	83rd to 87th percentile
Full professor	$68,214	$136,634	$98,974	High 70s – Low 100s Mid 100s at Elite Universities	86th to 91st percentile 96th percentile	87th to 91st percentile 97th percentile

== See also ==
- American Association of University Professors
- Academic discipline
- Academic rank
- Academic ranks in the United States
- Lecturer
- Scholarly method
