= Hartmut Fünfgeld =

German geographer

Hartmut Fünfgeld (born 1975) is a German geographer. He is professor of practice for Local Government Climate Resilience at La Trobe University, Melbourne.

== Career ==
Hartmut Fünfgeld studied Geography as a major together with two minor subjects, Ethnology and Geology, from 1997 to 2002. During his studies he spent one term abroad in Melbourne and completed them in 2002 with a degree in Geography. Then he worked as a researcher at Heidelberg University and in 2007 obtained a doctorate in geography for his work "Fishing in Muddy Waters: Socio-Environmental Relations under the Impact of Violence in Eastern Sri Lanka“. He went to Melbourne and worked for different organisations in the fields of climate change adaption and environmental politics, amongst others the RMIT Climate Change Adaptation Program of the University of Melbourne. There he became Professor for Sustainability and City Planning in 2016. In 2018 he moved on to the University of Freiburg, to work as a professor for the chair of Geography of the Global Change (german: Geographie des Globalen Wandels), at the institute for socio-environmental studies and geography.

Together with his study groups in Freiburg, he researched social and institutional impacts of climate change and climate change adaptability. In this field, Fünfgeld's team especially focused on potentials for communal and regional planning. Further large-scale research areas are processes of social transformation and social justice in the context of global change.

In January 2026 Fünfgeld moved to Melbourne to start his work as a professor for Local Government Climate Resilience in the School of Humanities and Social Sciences at Melbourne's La Trobe University. He continues to be an honorary professor for the University of Freiburg.

== Publications ==
- Fishing in muddy waters. Socio-environmental relations under the impact of violence in eastern Sri Lanka . Verl. für Entwicklungspolitik, Saarbrücken 2007, ISBN 978-3-88156-791-6, approved dissertation at the University of Heidelberg, Heidelberg 2006.
- with Darryn McEvoy: Resilience as a Useful Concept for Climate Change Adaptation? In: Planning Theory and Practice, 2012; 13 (2) : p. 324-328.
- with Darryn McEvoy, Karyn Bosomworth: Resilience and Climate Change Adaptation: The Importance of Framing. In: Planning Practice and Research, 2013; 28 (3) : p. 280-293, doi:10.1080/02697459.2013.787710.
- Facilitating local climate change adaptation through transnational municipal networks. In: Current Opinion in Environmental Sustainability, 2015; 12, p. 67-73, doi:10.1016/j.cosust.2014.10.011.
- Institutional tipping points in climate change adaptation processes. In: Journal of Extreme Events, 2017; 4 (1) 1750002, doi:10.1142/S2345737617500026.
- with Kate Lonsdale, Karyn Bosomworth: Beyond the tools: supporting adaptation when organisational resources and capacities are in short supply. In: Climatic Change, 2019; 153 (4) : p. 625-641, doi:10.1007/s10584-018-2238-7.
