= Associate instructor =

Low-level academic rank

Associate Instructor (AI) is a title commonly used in higher education institutions, particularly in the United States, to refer to graduate students or academic staff members who assist in teaching or teach undergraduate or lower-level courses. The role and responsibilities associated with the title may vary by institution, department, and region.

== Overview ==
The term Associate Instructor is often used interchangeably with or as an institutional variant of Graduate Teaching Assistant (GTA), Teaching Fellow, or Teaching Assistant (TA). However, some universities use the title Associate Instructor to designate graduate students with more extensive teaching responsibilities than a typical TA, including the autonomy to design syllabi, lead entire classes, and assign grades.

== Responsibilities ==
Typical duties of an associate instructor may include: leading discussion sections, labs, or tutorials; delivering lectures independently; holding office hours for student consultations; grading assignments and exams; preparing course materials; managing course learning platforms (e.g., Canvas, Moodle).

In some institutions, particularly research universities, associate instructors are expected to serve as the primary instructor of record for a course (Instructor of record, IOR), especially at the undergraduate level.

== Employment status ==
Associate Instructors are typically compensated through stipends, tuition waivers, or hourly wages, depending on their workload and the funding structure of the institution. They are usually enrolled as full-time graduate students and their teaching responsibilities form part of their professional development and financial support package.

== See also ==
- Teaching Fellow
- Lecturer
- Academic Ranks (United States)
