= Academic ranks in the United States =

Academic ranks in the United States are the titles, relative importance and power of professors, researchers, and administrative personnel held in academia.

== Professorship ==
=== Common positions ===
For regular faculty (i.e., not counting administrative faculty positions such as chairships or deanships, nor positions considered "staff" rather than faculty), typical tenure-track positions include:

- Distinguished / Chaired (or similar) professor (other such titles of special distinction vary by institution)
- Professor ("full professor", i.e., the destination of the "tenure track," upon exhausting all promotions other than those of special distinction)
- Associate professor (a mid-level, usually tenured, faculty member, which can lead to "full" professor)
- Assistant professor (typically entry-level for "tenure track" positions which can lead to associate professor)

Permanent full-time faculty positions that are often non-tenure-track can include:

- Lecturer, Instructor, Teaching Professor (usually non-tenure-track positions which can nevertheless be full-time and permanent, with duties including teaching and service but not research; sometimes these categories entail their own respective ranking hierarchies)
- Clinical Professor, Professor of Practice (usually non-tenure-track positions which can be full-time and permanent, but whose teaching tends to focus on practical rather than scholarly expertise; sometimes these categories have their own respective ranking hierarchies)
- Research Associate, Research Professor. Varies by institution; sometimes given to people who also work, in parallel, for a research institute not connected to a university or are faculty on a department performing only research, typically on grant-based "soft money". Research professors typically do not teach.

Positions that tend to be temporary and/or part-time include:

- Adjunct Professor, Adjunct Instructor, Adjunct Lecturer. Faculty who serve part-time, and typically also work actively in their profession (e.g. medicine, engineering, law).
- Visiting Professorships and Professor-in-Residence. May also include assistant, associate, and full levels/ranks. Such titles are typically used for temporary, non-tenure track appointments for a period of time. In some cases, faculty members in these titles may be asked to carry out all aspects of regular faculty roles, teaching, research and service, and must meet the same professional criteria as the tenure track faculty. Sometimes these are renewable, although not indefinitely.

=== Background ===
Traditionally, Assistant Professor has been the usual entry-level rank for faculty on the "tenure track", although this depends on the institution and the field. Then, promotion to the rank of Associate Professor and later Professor (informally, "Full Professor") indicates that significant work has been done in research, teaching and institutional service. Although the associate rank usually indicates that a tenure-track professor has been granted tenure, some tenure-track personnel may be hired at the associate rank from another academic institution or a nonacademic profession contingent on the expectation that they will soon receive tenure. In rare instances, one may be tenured and remain at the assistant rank if promotion to the higher rank is not contingent on the bestowal of tenure. It typically takes about six years or so to advance in rank. The time for advancement between associate to full professor is less rigid than for assistant to associate. Typically, failure to be promoted to associate professor from assistant results in termination following a 1-year appointment. Although it can engender professional stigmatization, tenured faculty are usually permitted to remain in the associate grade indefinitely, with some institutions now conferring emeritus status at that rank.

In applied fields, such as engineering, law, education, medicine, business, or journalism – and lately expanding to others – faculty types can also include Clinical Professor or Professor of Practice. Often tied to secure, long-term contracts with significant review processes, these ranks are generally not tenure-track and emphasize practitioner knowledge and skills rather than scholarly research. Depending on the discipline and range of experience, incumbents in these positions may only possess an undergraduate degree or a secondary school diploma. A variant is the less-common title of Teaching Professor, which is not limited to professional fields. Recently, some institutions have created separate tenure tracks for such positions, which may also be given other names such as "lecturer with security of employment".

Other faculty who are not on the tenure track in the U.S. are often classified as Lecturers (or more advanced Senior Lecturers) or Instructors, who may teach full-time or have some administrative duties, but have no research obligations, which also come in various forms and may be either tenure-track or not. Both Lecturers and Instructors typically hold advanced graduate/professional degrees. The term "professor" as a common noun is often used for persons holding any kind of faculty position. In academic medicine, Instructor usually denotes someone who has completed residency, fellowship, or other post-doctoral (M.D./D.O.) training but who is not tenure-track faculty.

Any faculty title preceded with the qualifier "Adjunct" normally denotes part-time status. Adjunct faculty may have primary employment elsewhere, though in today's saturated academic market many doctorate-holders seek to earn a living from several adjunct jobs. At some institutions, the job title Part-time Lecturer (PTL) is used instead.

Although "Professor" is often the highest rank attained by a senior faculty member, some institutions may offer a unique title to a senior faculty member whose research or publications have achieved wide recognition. This may be a "named professorship" or "named chair" – for example, the "John Doe Professor of Philosophy". Named chairs typically but not exclusively include a small discretionary fund from an endowment set aside for the recipient's use. Large research universities also offer a small fraction of tenured faculty the title of "Distinguished Professor", "Distinguished Teaching Professor", or "Distinguished Research Professor" to recognize outstanding contributions. Some universities have as their highest rank "University/Institute Professor"; such faculty members are not usually answerable to deans or department heads and may report directly to the university provost.

In research, faculty who direct a lab or research group may in certain research contexts (e.g., grant applications) be called Principal Investigator, or P.I., though this refers to their management role and is not usually thought of as an academic rank.

Excepting special ranks (such as endowed chairs), academic rank is dependent upon the promotion process of each college or university. Thus, a tenured associate professor at one institution might accept a "lower" position at another university (i.e., an assistant professorship) because of its connection to the "tenure track." In some cases, an assistant professor who accepts a position of similar rank at another university may negotiate "time towards tenure", which indicates a shorter required probationary period, usually in recognition of prior academic achievements.

=== Common special or qualified faculty appointments ===
Modifier	Example	Explanation
Research	Research Professor (Senior Research Associate or Senior Research Scientist); Research Associate Professor (Research Associate or Research Scientist); Research Assistant Professor (Associate Research Scientist or Assistant Researcher); Instructor	Indicates a full-time research position (and sometimes part-time) with few or no teaching responsibilities. Research professorships are almost always funded by grants or fellowships apart from the regular university budget; teaching faculty may be funded by either grants or the university, with the latter typically being ultimately responsible to ensure at least a minimum curricula are offered.
Clinical	Clinical Professor; Clinical Associate Professor; Clinical Assistant Professor	Indicates a full- or part-time non-tenured teaching position with limited or no research responsibilities, especially in the health sciences but also in other "professional" fields like law, business, and engineering. At a law school, "clinical" professors may have highly variable teaching and research responsibilities, but generally supervise student pro bono law practice. In most professional fields, this is largely similar to "Professor of Practice" or "Professor of Professional Practice" titles/positions. At some medical schools, "Clinical Professor of (specialty)" indicates full-time clinical faculty without research responsibilities, while "Professor of Clinical (specialty)" indicates voluntary faculty in private practice outside the institution who also have teaching responsibilities associated with their hospital privileges.
of-Practice	Principal Professor of Practice; Senior Professor of Practice; Assistant Professor of Practice; Professor of the Practice; Professors of Professional Practice	Appointed because of skills and expertise acquired in non-academic careers. Are principally engaged in teaching and are not expected to be significantly involved in research activities. Professors of practice are often highly experienced professionals with skills uncommon among academics and/or with a significant expertise in teaching highly specific topics. This title is also commonly synonymous with "Professor in the Practice".
Teaching	Assistant Teaching Professor; Associate Teaching Professor; (Full) Teaching Professor	Appointed to focus on teaching, plus typical faculty administrative service/committee roles. Any scholarly activities are typically independently of official duties. Principally engaged in teaching, and not expected to be significantly involved in research activities. May come with significant industry experience (similar to of-practice faculty), a focus on undergraduate courses (similar to lecturers), and/or expertise in highly-specific topics.
Professor by courtesy/affiliated professor	Professor	A professor who is primarily and originally associated with one academic department, but has become officially associated with a second department, institute, or program within the university and has assumed a professor's duty in that second department as well.
Adjunct	Adjunct Professor; Professorial Lecturer; Adjunct Associate Professor; Adjunct Instructor; Adjunct Assistant Professor	Indicates a part-time appointment; also may denote a faculty member from another academic department in the same institution whose expertise overlaps substantially with the department they're serving as an adjunct. Often the principal basis of expertise comes from professional experience rather than academic study (e.g., a practicing or retired engineer who teaches an engineering course). All adjunct titles (e.g. "Adjunct professor/lecturer/instructor") may in practice be fairly similar, as all adjunct positions tend to be treated separately from "regular" faculty overall.
Visiting	Visiting Professor; Visiting Associate Professor; Visiting Assistant Professor; Visiting Instructor	Almost always indicates a temporary appointment, often to fill a vacancy that has arisen due to the sabbatical or temporary absence of a regular faculty member. Sometimes a visiting position is ongoing, replacing the occupant every one to two years, as a way to bring different people to the institution or provide entry-level academics with an opportunity to demonstrate their potential (for their next employer).
Emeritus	Professor Emeritus/Emerita; Associate Professor Emeritus/Emerita; Assistant Professor Emeritus/Emerita	Indicates a retired member of the "regular" (not temporary or adjunct) faculty, who is usually not paid a regular salary but often retains office space and access to the university's facilities. Often "emeritus" (or the feminine form "emerita") carries with it an honorific recognition by the institution; retired faculty members may or may not be designated "emeritus."

The ranks of "Lecturer" (and sometimes "Senior Lecturer") are used at some American universities to denote permanent teaching positions (full or part-time) with few or no research responsibilities, in contrast to many other countries in which "Lecturer" may be considered equivalent to assistant or associate professor.

== Research personnel ==
Fellowships and Research scientist positions are most often limited-term appointments for postdoctoral researchers. They are not usually regarded as faculty positions, but rather staff, although some teaching may be involved (albeit usually not with ultimate course responsibility). A common list of such positions is as follows (many of which often entail various ranking systems – e.g. numbered ranks, adjectives like "intermediate" or "senior," etc.).

- Research Associate (general)
- Research Scientist (natural or social sciences)
- Research Engineer (engineering)
- Research Scholar (humanities)
- Research Technician (general)
- Research Assistant (general) [note, in many US universities, "research assistant" implies "graduate research assistant," i.e., a predoctoral position]. Paid non-student staff may also have this designation.
- Postdoctoral Fellow / Research Associate (general)

== Other teaching personnel ==
Teaching assistants (TAs) are known by various related terms and are typically graduate students who have varying levels of responsibility. A typical undergraduate class, for example, comprises lecture and small-group recitation/discussion sessions, with a faculty member giving the lecture, and TAs leading the small-group sessions; in other cases, the teaching of an entire class may be entrusted to a graduate student. (See for example A Handbook for Mathematics Teaching Assistants, published by the Mathematical Association of America.)

== Ecclesiastical ranks ==
Ecclesiastical seminaries and churches often grant the titles Doctor of Divinity (D.D.), Doctor of Metaphysics (Dr. mph.) or Doctor of Religious Science (Dr. sc. rel.), most commonly to meritorious clerics for an outstanding work or another achievement in the field of religious and Biblical studies.

== Other ==
At some universities, librarians have a rank structure parallel to that of tenure-track faculty (Assistant Librarian, Associate Librarian, Librarian); these ranks may or may not be associated with the granting of institutional tenure. Some senior librarians, and often the head librarian, may have faculty or faculty-equivalent rank.

== Administrative ranks ==
=== Officers of the corporation ===
- Chancellor / President / Principal
- Provost (sometimes called "Chancellor", or "President" or "Warden")
- Vice Provost
- Associate Provost
- Assistant Provost (assists the Provost, as do any associates; not superior to vice presidents)
- Vice-Chancellors or Vice Presidents (of Academic Affairs, Student Affairs, Finance, etc.)
- Associate Vice-Chancellor or Associate Vice President
- Assistant Vice-Chancellor or Assistant Vice President

=== Academic administrators ===
- Deans (often also Full Professors)
- Associate Deans (often also Full Professors )
- Assistant Dean (Usually Associate Professors)
- Directors of Administrative Departments
- Associate/Assistant Directors of Administrative Departments
- Chairs or Heads of Academic Departments

America's system of higher education is highly variable, with each of the 50 states and the six non-state jurisdictions regulating its own public tertiary institutions, and with each private institution developing its own structure. In general, the terms "President" and "Chancellor" are interchangeable (like "Premier" and "Prime Minister"), including the vice presidents, associate and assistant vice presidents, and so on. The dominant paradigm is president, vice president, associate vice president, and assistant vice president.

Some university systems or multi-campus universities use both titles, with one title for the chief executive of the entire system and the other for the chief executives of each campus. Which title refers to which position can be highly variable from state to state or even within a state. In California, for example, the chief executive officer of the entire California State University system of 23 campuses is called "Chancellor" while the CEO of each individual campus is called "President" — thus, there is an officer called "Chancellor of the California State University", and there is the "President of San Francisco State University". In the University of California, by contrast, the terms are reversed — thus, there is the "President of the University of California", and below that person in the hierarchy is the "Chancellor of the University of California, Los Angeles", and so on. The term "Vice Chancellor" in US institutions implies a subordinate to the chancellor, in contrast to many other countries in which the Vice Chancellor is functionally the head of the institution.

The term "Warden" is almost never used in the United States in an academic sense. Where it is used, it typically means "provost" or "dean".

Deans may head an individual college, school or faculty; or they may be deans of the student body, or a section of it (e.g., the dean of students in a law school); or they may be deans of a particular functional unit (e.g., Dean of Admissions, or Dean of Records); or they may be deans of a particular campus, or (unusually) of a particular building (e.g., a university with an elaborate performing arts complex might designate a very senior administrative faculty member as "Dean of the [Name] Performing Arts Center".

Academic department heads and chairs serve the same function, and there may also be associate and assistant department heads or chairs (though this is unusual). In medical schools, departments may be divided into sections or divisions by subspecialty, each with its own section chief or division chief.

== See also ==
- Professors in the United States
- Academic ranks in Canada
- Lecturer#United States
- List of academic ranks
- Teaching fellow#United States
