= Sessional lecturer =

Contract faculty in colleges

Sessional lecturer or sessional instructor are contract faculty who hold full- or part-time teaching positions and may perform administrative duties but have no research responsibilities. Sessionals hold short-term contracts, typically running one or two academic terms; in many post-secondary institutions sessional contracts may be renewed repeatedly but by definition, they offer no legal expectation of ongoing work. Unlike members of other academic ranks (e.g., Assistant Professors and Full Professors), sessional lecturers are ineligible for tenure. It is an academic rank for a type of job common in Canadian and Australian universities and colleges.

Although significant differences exist between the working conditions of sessional lecturers and professors, sessionals occupy a rank similar to that of adjunct professors in the United States. Historically, sessionals have been hired to address short-term teaching shortages and to replace tenure-stream faculty who are on leave or who are holding temporary administrative positions (e.g., Faculty Chair or Dean). Possibly because on a per-course basis sessionals earn much less than their tenure-stream counterparts, in the last three decades many universities and colleges have developed a heavy reliance on contract faculty, with the result that the Canadian post-secondary educational system has developed a structural reliance on sessional faculty. In a number of large research universities, including the University of British Columbia and the University of Toronto, sessionals now teach the majority of undergraduate courses in some departments.

Although most sessional lecturers are trained as researchers and hold a PhD or other terminal degree, their contracts usually specify only teaching responsibilities, and their research programs are rarely supported by the universities that employ them. Common impediments to sessionals' research activities have historically included low salaries, ineligibility for merit pay and internal research funding, and institutional policies against signing applications for funding from granting agencies. Because an active research program and a strong publishing record (for original research) in major journals is often a key qualification for entry into a tenure-stream position, work as a sessional lecturer is widely considered among academics to be an "employment ghetto".

The trend towards increasing reliance on sessional lecturers and other contract faculty is an instance of the casualization of academic work and has been criticized by the Canadian Association of University Teachers, which has proposed that the current per-course stipend be replaced by a pro-rata model that recognizes the teaching, research, and governance contributions of contract faculty.

As a labour group, sessional lecturers are organized in a variety of ways. In some universities, including Queen's, the University of Alberta, and the University of British Columbia, they are represented along with tenured and tenure-stream faculty in a single faculty association; in others, including University of Toronto, York University, and the University of Saskatchewan, they are represented as a distinct employment group by Canadian Union of Public Employee (CUPE) locals or stand-alone unions; in a few post-secondary institutions, they are not represented by a labour organization.
