= Effects of the Great Recession =

Economic events from 2007 to 2012

This information is related to the effects of the Great Recession that happened worldwide from 2007 to 2012.

== Overview ==
The Great Recession was the worst post-World War II contraction on record. Real gross domestic product (GDP) began contracting in the third quarter of 2008, and by early 2009 was falling at an annualized pace not seen since the 1950s. Capital investment, which was in decline year-on-year since the final quarter of 2006, matched the 1957–58 post war record in the first quarter of 2009. The pace of collapse in residential investment picked up speed in the first quarter of 2009, dropping 23.2% year-on-year, nearly four percentage points faster than in the previous quarter.

== Trade and industrial production ==
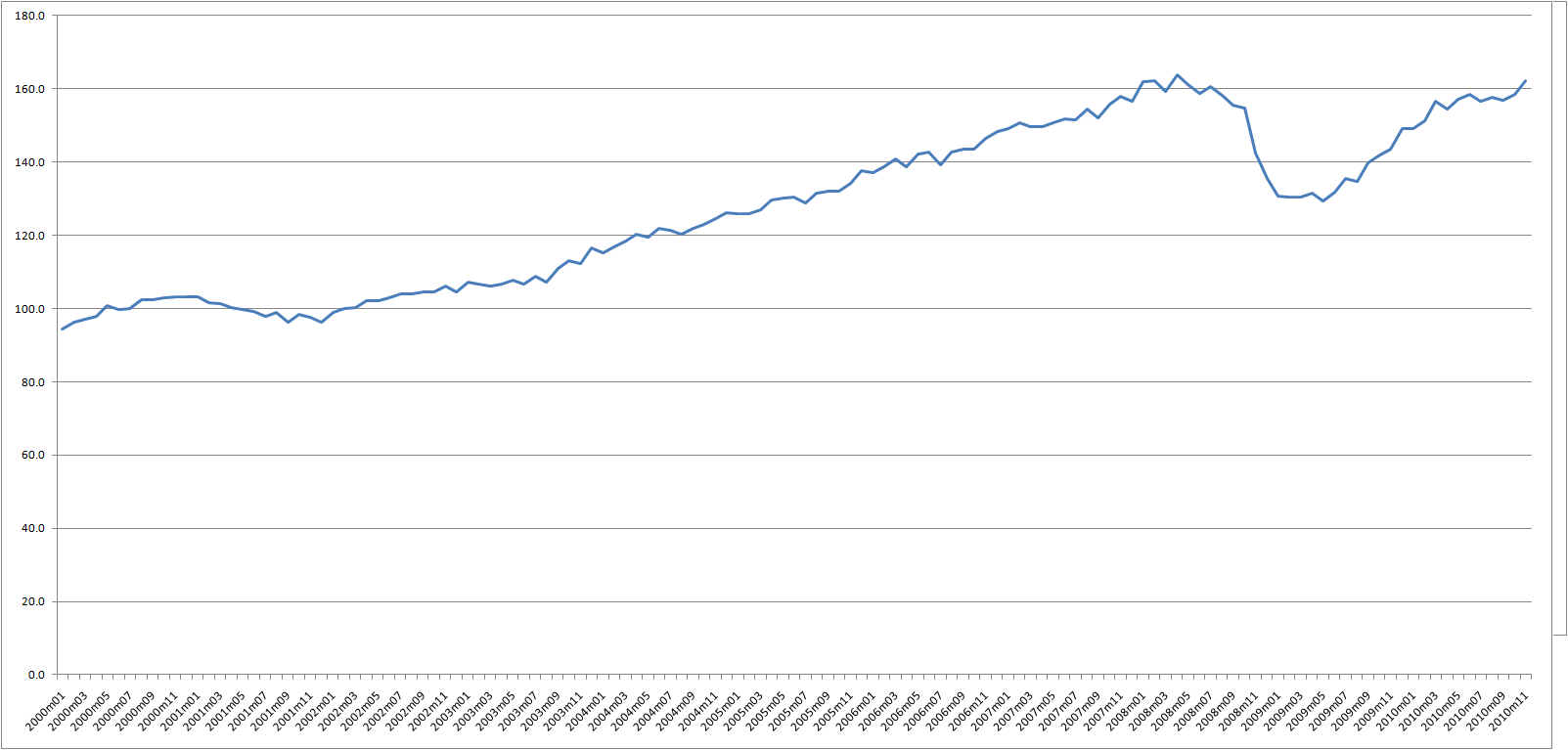
International trade, 2000-2010. 2000=100. A plunge in the volumes of exchanges can be seen as of the second half of 2008.

In middle-October 2008, the Baltic Dry Index, a measure of shipping volume, fell by 50% in one week, as the credit crunch made it difficult for exporters to obtain letters of credit.

In February 2009, The Economist claimed that the 2008 financial crisis had produced a "manufacturing crisis", with the strongest declines in industrial production occurring in export-based economies.

In March 2009, Britain's Daily Telegraph reported the following declines in industrial output, from January 2008 to January 2009: Japan −31%, Korea −26%, Russia −16%, Brazil −15%, Italy −14%, Germany −12%. Some analysts ventured that the world was going through a period of deglobalization and protectionism after years of increasing economic integration.

Sovereign funds and private buyers from the Middle East and Asia, including China, are increasingly buying in on stakes of European and U.S. businesses, including industrial enterprises. Due to the global recession they are available at a low price. The Chinese government has concentrated on natural-resource deals across the world, securing supplies of oil and minerals.

== Retail ==
Mall museums are a new global development resulting from the 2007-2010 global recession, where museums take over large spaces within shopping malls, making beneficial use of empty space, drawing shoppers, and leveraging the foot traffic of the malls to bring more people into museums, exhibits and other educational venues.

== Pollution ==
According to the International Energy Agency man-made greenhouse gas emissions would decrease by 3% in 2009, mainly as a result of the Great Recession. Previously emissions had been rising by around 3% per year. The drop in emissions is only the 4th to occur in 50 years.

== Unemployment ==
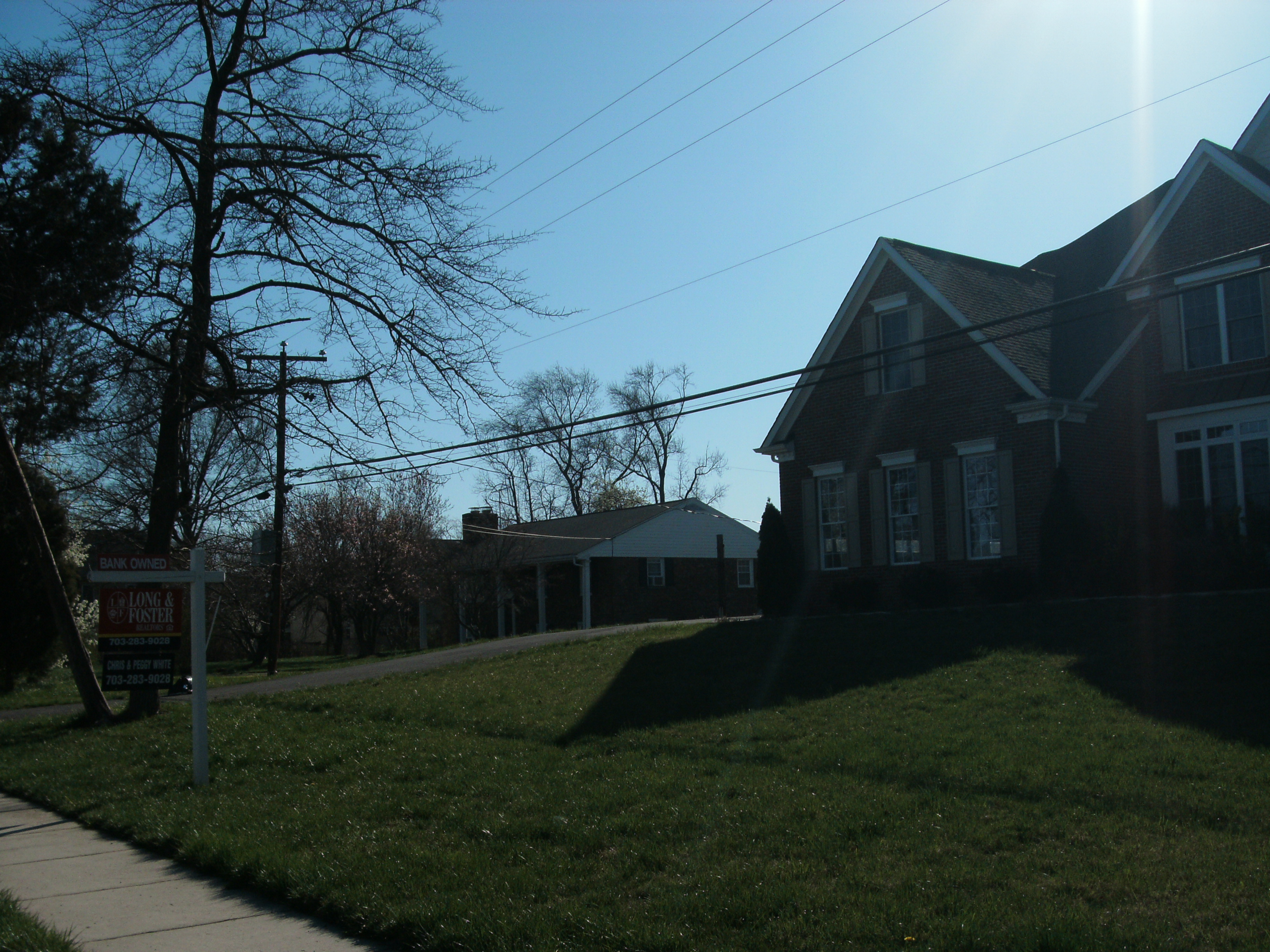
Many houses, such as this one in Virginia, were foreclosed upon by banks and sold as a result of the Great Recession; note the label "Bank Owned" on the sign in front of the house.

The International Labour Organization (ILO) predicted that at least 20 million jobs will have been lost by the end of 2009 due to the crisis — mostly in "construction, real estate, financial services, and the auto sector" — bringing world unemployment above 200 million for the first time. The number of unemployed people worldwide could increase by more than 50 million in 2009 as the global recession intensifies, the ILO has forecast.

In December 2007, the U.S. unemployment rate was 4.9%. By October 2009, the unemployment rate had risen to 10.1%. A broader measure of unemployment (taking into account marginally attached workers, those employed part-time for economic reasons, and some (but not all) discouraged workers) was 16.3%. In July 2009, fewer jobs were lost than expected, dipping the unemployment rate from 9.5% to 9.4%. Even fewer jobs were lost in August, 216,000, recorded as the lowest number of jobs since September 2008, but the unemployment rate rose to 9.7%. In October 2009, news reports announced that some employers who cut jobs due to the recession are beginning to hire them back. More recently, economists announced in January 2010 that economic growth in the U.S. resumed in the fourth quarter of 2009, and some have predicted that limited job growth will begin in the spring of 2010.

The average numbers for European Union nations are similar to the US ones. Some European countries have been hit by recession very hard, for instance Spain's unemployment rate reached 18.7% (37% for youths) in May 2009 — the highest in the eurozone. In the UK, youths bore the brunt of unemployment during the recession.

The rise of advanced economies in Brazil, India, and China increased the total global labor pool dramatically. Recent improvements in communication and education in those countries has allowed workers in those countries to compete more closely with workers in traditionally strong economies, such as the United States. This huge surge in labor supply provided downward pressure on wages and contributed to unemployment. So many people's professional careers have been down to frozen level at this time. There was also change at the management level of the several organisations and due to this there was a huge employee turnover. In brief it can also be described as the collapse of the entire management system of any organisation. It has also been noted that there was an increase in the NPAs of lending by banks.

== Health ==
In the United States, the public health workforce decreased by at least 40,000 jobs (about 1/5 of its workforce) between 2010 and 2013, following the Great Recession. As of 2023, it had not recovered.

Although it has been argued that recessions can benefit health, for example through reductions in road traffic accidents when car use reduces due to unemployment, there is a lot of evidence that the Great Recession did widespread damage to health. According to a study of 54 countries, there has been an increase in suicide deaths as a result of the recession. The study cites that there were an estimated 5,000 additional deaths resulting from suicide in the year 2009 alone. In Iceland rates of low birth weight were found to increase after the start of the recession in 2008, although no differences in preterm birth were found. In England, exposure to the Great Recession during pregnancy was associated with financial hardship, and both of these were associated with increased odds of continuing to smoke during pregnancy.

== Financial markets ==
For a time, major economies of the 21st century were believed to have begun a period of decreased volatility, which was sometimes dubbed The Great Moderation, because many economic variables appeared to have achieved relative stability. The return of commodity, stock market, and currency value volatility are regarded as indications that the concepts behind the Great Moderation were guided by false beliefs.

January 2008 was an especially volatile month in world stock markets, with a surge in implied volatility measurements of the US-based S&P 500 index, and a sharp decrease in non-U.S. stock market prices on Monday, January 21, 2008 (continuing to a lesser extent in some markets on January 22). Some headline writers and a general news columnist called January 21 "Black Monday" and referred to a "global shares crash," though the effects were quite different in different markets.

The effects of these events were also felt on the Shanghai Composite Index in China which lost 5.14 percent, most of this on financial stocks such as Ping An Insurance and China Life which lost 10 and 8.76 percent respectively. Investors worried about the effect of a recession in the US economy would have on the Chinese economy. Citigroup estimates due to the number of exports from China to America a one percent drop in US economic growth would lead to a 1.3 percent drop in China's growth rate.

There were several large Monday declines in stock markets worldwide during 2008, including one in January, one in August, one in September, and another in early October. As of October 2008, stocks in North America, Europe, and the Asia-Pacific region had all fallen by about 30% since the beginning of the year. The Dow Jones Industrial Average had fallen about 37% since January 2008.

The simultaneous multiple crises affecting the US financial system in mid-September 2008 caused large falls in markets both in the US and elsewhere. Numerous indicators of risk and of investor fear (the TED spread, Treasury yields, the dollar value of gold) set records.

Russian markets, already falling due to declining oil prices and political tensions with the West, fell over 10% in one day, leading to a suspension of trading, while other emerging markets also exhibited losses.

On September 18, UK regulators announced a temporary ban on short-selling of financial stocks. On September 19 the U.S. Securities and Exchange Commission (SEC) followed by placing a temporary ban of short-selling stocks of 799 specific financial institutions. In addition, the SEC made it easier for institutions to buy back shares of their institutions. The action is based on the view that short selling in a crisis market undermines confidence in financial institutions and erodes their stability.

On September 22, the Australian Securities Exchange (ASX) delayed opening by an hour after a decision was made by the Australian Securities and Investments Commission (ASIC) to ban all short selling on the ASX. This was revised slightly a few days later.

As is often the case in times of financial turmoil and loss of confidence, investors turned to assets which they perceived as tangible or sustainable. The price of gold rose by 30% from middle of 2007 to end of 2008. A further shift in investors' preference towards assets like precious metals or land is discussed in the media.

In March 2009, Blackstone Group CEO Stephen Schwarzman said that up to 45% of global wealth had been destroyed in little less than a year and a half.

== Travel ==
According to Zagat's 2009 U.S. Hotels, Resorts & Spas survey, business travel has decreased in the past year as a result of the recession. 30% of travelers surveyed stated they travel less for business today while only 21% of travelers stated that they travel more. Reasons for the decline in business travel include company travel policy changes, personal economics, economic uncertainty and high airline prices. Hotels are responding to the downturn by dropping rates, ramping up promotions and negotiating deals for both business travelers and tourists.

According to the World Tourism Organization, international travel suffered a strong slowdown beginning in June 2008, and this declining trend intensified during 2009 resulting in a reduction from 922 million international tourist arrivals in 2008 to 880 million visitors in 2009, representing a worldwide decline of 4%, and an estimated 6% decline in international tourism receipts. The decline caused by the recession was further exacerbated in some countries due to the outbreak of the AH1N1 virus.

== Insurance ==
A February 2009 study on the main British insurers showed that most of them do not plan to raise their insurance premiums for the year 2009, in spite of the prediction of a 20% raise made by The Daily Telegraph and The Daily Mirror. However, it is expected that the capital liquidity will become an issue and determine increases, having their capital tied up in investments yielding smaller dividends, corroborated with the £644 million underwriting losses suffered in 2007.

== Countries most affected ==
The crisis affected all countries in some ways, but certain countries were vastly affected more than others. By measuring currency devaluation, equity market decline, and the rise in sovereign bond spreads, a picture of financial devastation emerges. Since these three indicators show financial weakness, taken together, they capture the impact of the crisis. The Carnegie Endowment for International Peace reports in its International Economics Bulletin that Ukraine, as well as Argentina and Jamaica, were the countries most deeply affected by the crisis. Other severely affected countries were Romania, Ireland, Russia, Mexico, Hungary, the Baltic states. By contrast, China, Japan, Brazil, India, Iran, Peru and Australia were "among the least affected."

== Autocratization ==
V-Dem report on countries autocratizing (red) or democratizing (blue) substantially and significantly (2010–2020). Countries in grey are not substantially changed.

The third wave of autocratization is a scholarly proposition that countries worldwide have trended away from liberal democracy toward authoritarianism in the 21st century. The war on terror, the Great Recession, and the COVID-19 pandemic were some of the most significant events in exacerbating autocratization. Since the 2010s, more countries have been autocratizing than democratizing.

Some scholars argue the third wave of autocratization accelerated in the 2010s (in the aftermath of the Great Recession), particularly at the end of the decade, when the number of liberal democracies was at an all-time high. From 2010 to 2020, the V-Dem Institute reported a global decline in liberal democracy.

A 2020 study by V-Dem and University of Gothenburg scholars, State of the world 2019: autocratization surges – resistance grows, argued "the third wave of autocratization, that was already accelerating in 2019, risks gaining unprecedented momentum." Other scholars argued in 2019 that while the third wave is unfolding, "panic is not warranted: the current declines are relatively mild and the global share of democratic countries remains close to its all-time high."

== Gendered effects ==
American popular media labeled the Great Recession the "mancession" because of the many male dominated industries affected (e.g., construction) although many more men were hired than women during the recovery period. By the end of 2009 the unemployment rate for men was 10.7%, while women's unemployment peaked at 8.4%. This trend of the "mancession" was seen in other countries as well; in 2008 605,000 of the 891,000 who lost their jobs in the United Kingdom were men.

The stress of unemployment affects men and women differently. Some studies have concluded that men and blue-collar workers experience the most mental distress when they are involuntarily unemployed This has been attributed to the greater structural vulnerability of blue collar workers in US economy as well as constructions of masculinity. Men may feel pressure to fulfill their socially constructed role as "breadwinners" and may feel ashamed if they are not able to contribute financially to the household.

A study of mental health data in America from directly after the 2008 financial crisis and the Great Recession, however, found that women experienced more stress than men because they were more likely to be the financial managers of the household and therefore felt more of the impact of the recession on household budgets. In Greece women also reported poor mental health, more so than men, upon losing their jobs. This has been attributed to higher rates of long term unemployment, poor housing and nutrition, debt, and discrimination, which all generally affect women more.
