= Mall museum =

A mall museum is a shopping mall integrated with a museum. It is a new development resulting from the 2007–2010 global recession, when museums took over large spaces within shopping malls, making beneficial use of the space and leveraging the foot traffic of the malls to bring more people into museums, exhibits and other educational venues. The trend has occurred in various countries including Iran, Turkey, Spain and the United States.

== Locations ==
=== Middle East ===
Isfahan City Center is a newly opened shopping mall, the largest shopping mall in Iran, and the largest shopping mall in the world with a museum. Its museum has the valuables from seven thousands years ago in an area of 16,000 square meters and more than 15 different collections including stamps, bill, coin, and art collections. Its main purpose is to make the world aware of Iran's history.

=== Europe ===
For example, one of the newest museums to open is the new Rock and Roll Museum housed in the newly opened shopping complex called Arenas de Barcelona mall in Barcelona, Spain. The mall was opened in March 2011 in what originally was a historic bullring called Plaza de Toros las Arenas (the Sands Bullring). The original bullring, designed by Catalan architect Lluís Domènech i Montaner, was converted into a mall and entertainment center because of the decline in the popularity of bullfighting. The Museum of Rock Music claims to have one of the largest collections of rock music memorabilia in Europe, including 500 pieces from the Barcelona Private Rock Music Museum Foundation, and features four main exhibit rooms, including one devoted to rock music of Spain, one dedicated to the Beatles and another to the Rolling Stones. The fourth room will have temporary exhibits.

The Forum Istanbul shopping mall is home to the first ice museum in Turkey and opened on 23 April 2010. The year-round museum hands out arctic coats to all visitors at the entrance because the museum temperature inside is around minus 5 degrees Celsius (about 23 Fahrenheit).

=== United States ===
One of the first museums to open within a shopping mall in the United States is the Hungarian Heritage Museum at The Galleria at Erieview Mall in Cleveland, Ohio. The museum, sponsored by the Cleveland Hungarian Heritage Society, opened on 15 March 2003.

Arizona has a number of museums opening or planning to open in vacant retail space. In December 2010, the Scottsdale International Auto Museum announced plans to open with approximately 100 cars on display at the Scottsdale Pavilions shopping center in Arizona.

In May 2010, Sea Life Arizona, a 26,000-square-foot (2,400 m^{2})-aquarium, opened in the Arizona Mills Mall in Tempe. Sea Life Arizona is operated by Merlin Entertainments Group, the second-largest themed attraction operator in the world behind Disney. The Tempe aquarium is one of 33 Sea Life museums operated by Merlin in eleven countries. The aquarium features more than 5,000 sea creatures including sea horse, octopus and sting-ray exhibits.

The Pop Culture Experience museum opened 8 April 2011 in Desert Ridge Shopping Mall in north Phoenix, and features Apollo 11 memorabilia, Barbie dolls, Superman figures and collectibles from popular television shows and movies that are part of America's pop culture from the 1960s to today.
