= Professor =

Academic title at universities and other educational institutions

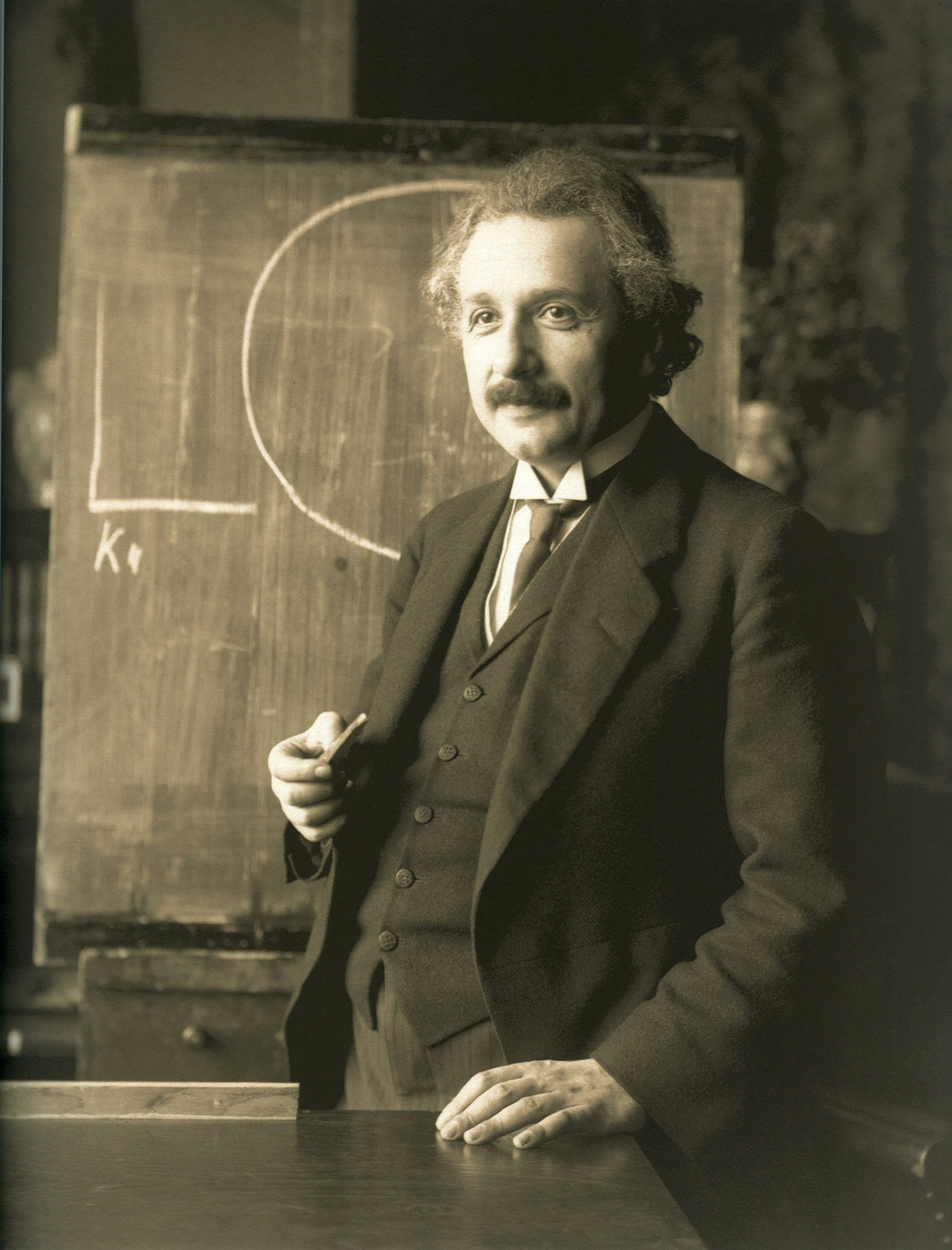
- Albert Einstein as a professor

Occupation
- Names: Professor
- Occupation type: Education, research, teaching
- Activity sectors: Academics

Description
- Competencies: Academic knowledge, research, writing journal articles or book chapters, teaching
- Education required: Master's degree, doctoral degree (e.g., PhD), professional degree, or other terminal degree
- Fields of employment: Academics
- Related jobs: Teacher, lecturer, reader, researcher

Professor (commonly abbreviated as Prof.) is an academic rank at universities and other post-secondary education and research institutions in most countries. Literally, professor derives from Latin as a 'person who professes'. Professors are usually experts in their field and teachers of the highest rank.

In most systems of academic ranks, "professor" as an unqualified title refers only to the most senior academic position, sometimes informally known as "full professor". In some countries and institutions, the word professor is also used in titles of lower ranks such as associate professor and assistant professor. This is particularly the case in the United States, where the unqualified word is also used colloquially to refer to associate and assistant professors, and often to instructors or lecturers, as well.

Professors often conduct original research and commonly teach undergraduate, postgraduate, or professional courses in their fields of expertise. In universities with graduate schools, professors may mentor and supervise graduate students conducting research for a thesis or dissertation. In many universities, full professors take on senior managerial roles such as leading departments, research teams and institutes, and filling roles such as president, principal or vice-chancellor. The role of professor may be more public-facing than that of more junior staff, and professors are expected to be national or international leaders in their field of expertise.

== Etymology ==
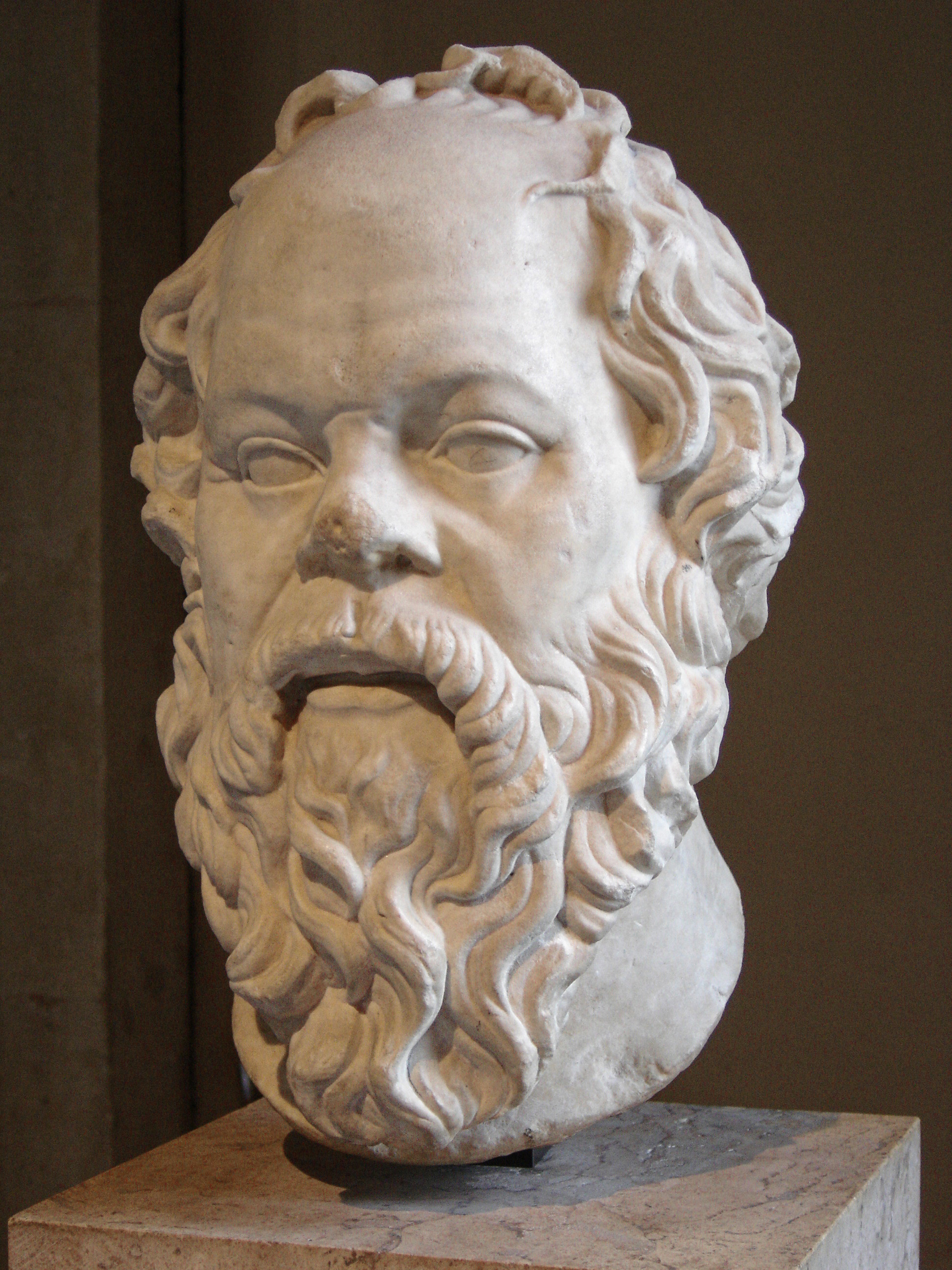
The Ancient Greek philosopher Socrates was one of the earliest recorded professors.

The term professor was first used in the late 14th century to mean 'one who teaches a branch of knowledge'. The word comes "from Old French professeur (14c.) and directly from [the] Latin professor[, for] 'person who professes to be an expert in some art or science; teacher of highest rank'; the Latin term came from the "agent noun from profiteri, meaning 'lay claim to, declare openly'. As a title that is "prefixed to a name, it dates from 1706". The "[s]hort form prof is recorded from 1838". The term professor is also used with a different meaning: "[o]ne professing religion. This canting use of the word comes down from the Elizabethan period, but is obsolete in England."

== Description ==
A professor is an accomplished and recognized academic. In most Commonwealth nations, as well as northern Europe, the title professor is the highest academic rank at a university. In the United States and Canada, the title of professor applies to most post-doctoral academics, so a larger percentage are thus designated. In these areas, professors are scholars with doctorate degrees (typically PhD degrees) or equivalent qualifications who teach in colleges and universities. An emeritus professor is a title given to selected retired professors with whom the university wishes to continue to be associated due to their stature and ongoing research. Emeritus professors do not receive a salary, but they are often given office or lab space, and use of libraries, labs, and so on.

The term professor is also used in the titles assistant professor and associate professor, which are not considered professor-level positions in all European countries. In Australia, the title associate professor is used in place of the term reader as used in the United Kingdom and other Commonwealth countries; ranking above senior lecturer and below full professor.

Beyond holding the proper academic title, universities in many countries also give notable artists, athletes and foreign dignitaries the title honorary professor, even if these persons do not have the academic qualifications typically necessary for professorship and they do not take up professorial duties. However, such "professors" usually do not undertake academic work for the granting institution. In general, the title of professor is strictly used for academic positions rather than for those holding it on honorary basis.

== Tasks ==
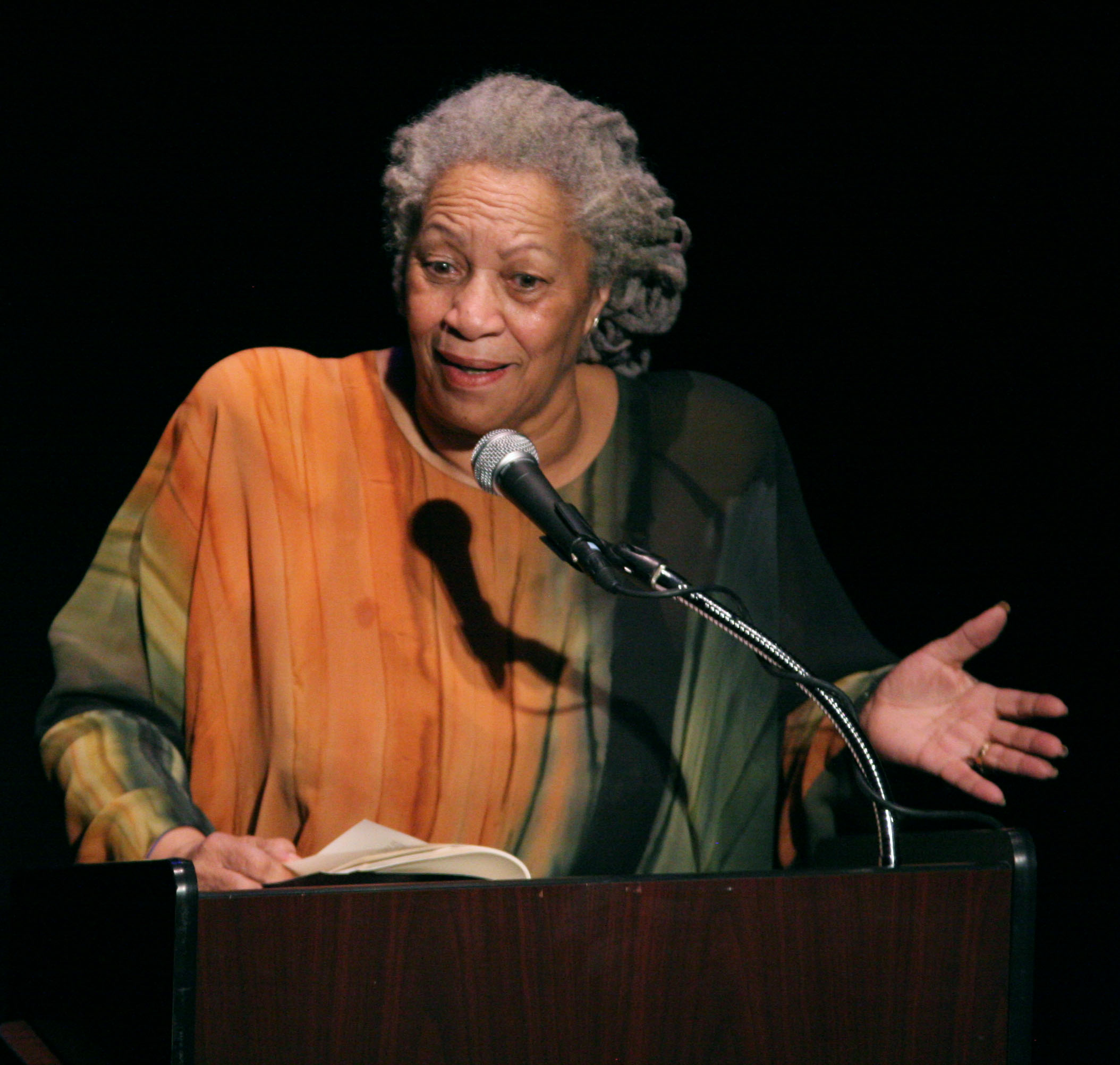
Toni Morrison, Emeritus Professor at Princeton University

Professors are qualified experts in their field who generally perform some or all of the following tasks:

- Managing teaching, research, and publications in their departments (in countries where a professor is head of a department);
- Presenting lectures and seminars in their specialties (i.e., they "profess");
- Performing, leading and publishing advanced original research in peer reviewed journals in their fields;
- Providing community service, including consulting functions (such as advising government and nonprofit organizations) or providing expert commentary on TV or radio news or public affairs programs;
- Mentoring graduate students in their academic training;
- Mentoring more junior academic staff;
- Conducting administrative or managerial functions, usually at a high level (e.g. deans, heads of departments, research centers, etc.); and
- Assessing students in their fields of expertise (e.g., through grading examinations or viva voce defenses).

Other roles of professorial tasks depend on the institution, its legacy, protocols, place (country), and time. For example, professors at research-oriented universities in North America and, generally, at European universities, are promoted primarily on the basis of research achievements and external grant-raising success.

== Around the world ==
Many colleges and universities and other institutions of higher learning throughout the world follow a similar hierarchical ranking structure amongst scholars in academia; the list above provides details.

== Salary ==
Salary of professors, as reported in the 2005 report the Deutscher Hochschulverband DHV. Bars are for assistant professor, associate professor and full professor, respectively.

A professor typically earns a base salary and a range of employee benefits. In addition, a professor who undertakes additional roles in their institution (e.g., department chair, dean, head of graduate studies, etc.) sometimes earns additional income. Some professors also earn additional income by activities such as consulting, publishing academic or other books, giving speeches, or coaching executives. Some fields (e.g., business and computer science) give professors more opportunities for outside work.

=== Germany and Switzerland ===
A report from 2005 by the "Deutscher Hochschulverband DHV", a lobby group for German professors, the salary of professors, the annual salary of a German professor is €46,680 in group "W2" (mid-level) and €56,683 in group "W3" (the highest level), without performance-related bonuses. The anticipated average earnings with performance-related bonuses for a German professor is €71,500. The anticipated average earnings of a professor working in Switzerland vary for example between 158,953 CHF (€102,729) to 232,073 CHF (€149,985) at the University of Zurich and 187,937 CHF (€121,461) to 247,280 CHF (€159,774) at the ETH Zurich; the regulations are different depending on the Cantons of Switzerland.

=== Italy ===
As of 2021, in the Italian universities there are about 18 thousand Assistant Professors, 23 thousand Associate Professors, and 14 thousand Full Professors. The role of "professore a contratto" (the equivalent of an "adjunct professor"), a non-tenured position which does not require a PhD nor any habilitation but requires a public academic competition (in which the PhD title is a preferential qualification), is paid at the end of the academic year nearly €3000 for the entire academic year, without salary during the academic year. There are about 28 thousand "Professori a contratto" in Italy. Associate Professors have a gross salary in between 52.937,59 and 96.186,12 euros per year, Full Professors have a gross salary in between 75.431,76 and 131.674 Euros per year, and adjunct professors of around 3,000 euros per year.

As of 2025 in the Italian universities there are: 16,574 Full Professors 26,472 Associate Professors with salary and 33,535 "Professori a contratto" without salary.

=== Saudi Arabia ===
According to World Salaries 2023, the salary of a professor in any public university is 447,300 SAR, or 119,217.18 USD

=== Spain ===
The salaries of civil servant professors in Spain are fixed on a nationwide basis, but there are some bonuses related to performance and seniority and a number of bonuses granted by the Autonomous Regional governments. These bonuses include three-year premiums (Spanish: trienios, according to seniority), five-year premiums (quinquenios, according to compliance with teaching criteria set by the university) and six-year premiums (sexenios, according to compliance with research criteria laid down by the national government). These salary bonuses are relatively small. Nevertheless, the total number of sexenios is a prerequisite for being a member of different committees.

The importance of these sexenios as a prestige factor in the university was enhanced by legislation in 2001 (LOU). Some indicative numbers can be interesting, in spite of the variance in the data. We report net monthly payments (after taxes and social security fees), without bonuses: Ayudante, €1,200; Ayudante Doctor, €1,400; Contratado Doctor; €1,800; Profesor Titular, €2,000; Catedrático, €2,400. There are a total of 14 payments per year, including 2 extra payments in July and December (but for less than a normal monthly payment).

=== United States ===
Professors in the United States commonly occupy any of several positions in academia. In the U.S., the word "professor" informally refers collectively to the academic ranks of assistant professor, associate professor, or professor. This usage differs from the predominant usage of the word "professor" internationally, where the unqualified word "professor" only refers to full professors. The majority of university lecturers and instructors in the United States, as of 2015, do not occupy these tenure-track ranks, but are part-time adjuncts.

=== Table of wages ===
In 2007 the Dutch social fund for the academic sector SoFoKleS commissioned a comparative study of the wage structure of academic professions in the Netherlands in relation to that of other countries. Among the countries reviewed are the United States, the United Kingdom, Switzerland, Germany, Belgium, France, Sweden and the Netherlands. To improve comparability, adjustments have been made to correct for purchasing power and taxes. Because of differences between institutions in the US and UK these countries have two listings of which one denotes the salary in top-tier institutions (based on the Shanghai-ranking).

The table below shows the final reference wages (per year) expressed in net amounts of Dutch euros in 2014 (i.e., converted into Dutch purchasing power).

NL comparison, 2014, net salaries, in NL purchasing power
Country	Assistant professor	Associate professor	Full professor
United States	€46,475	€52,367	€77,061
United States – top universities	€59,310	€68,429	€103,666
United Kingdom	€36,436	€44,952	€60,478
United Kingdom – top universities	€39,855	€45,235	€84,894
Germany	€33,182	€42,124	€47,894
France	€24,686	€30,088	€38,247
Netherlands	€34,671	€42,062	€50,847
Switzerland	€78,396	€89,951	€101,493
Belgium	€32,540	€37,429	€42,535
Sweden	€30,005	€35,783	€42,357
Norway	€34,947	€37,500	€45,113

== Research professor ==
In a number of countries, the title "research professor" refers to a professor who is exclusively or mainly engaged in research, and who has few or no teaching obligations. For example, the title is used in this sense in the United Kingdom (where it is known as a research professor at some universities and professorial research fellow at some other institutions) and in northern Europe. A research professor is usually the most senior rank of a research-focused career pathway in those countries and is regarded as equal to the ordinary full professor rank. Most often they are permanent employees, and the position is often held by particularly distinguished scholars; thus the position is often seen as more prestigious than an ordinary full professorship. The title is used in a somewhat similar sense in the United States, with the exception that research professors in the United States are often not permanent employees and often must fund their salary from external sources, which is usually not the case elsewhere.

== In fiction ==
Traditional fictional portrayals of professors, in accordance with a stereotype, are shy, absent-minded individuals often lost in thought. In many cases, fictional professors are socially or physically awkward. Examples include the 1961 film The Absent-Minded Professor or Professor Calculus of The Adventures of Tintin stories. Professors have also been portrayed as being misguided into an evil pathway, such as Professor Metz, who helped Bond villain Blofeld in the film Diamonds Are Forever; or simply evil, like Professor Moriarty, archenemy of British detective Sherlock Holmes. The modern animated series Futurama has Professor Hubert Farnsworth, a typical absent-minded but genius-level professor. A related stereotype is the mad scientist.

Vladimir Nabokov, author and professor of English at Cornell, frequently used professors as the protagonists in his novels. Professor Henry Higgins is a main character in George Bernard Shaw's play Pygmalion. In the Harry Potter series, set at the wizard school Hogwarts, the teachers are known as professors, many of whom play important roles, notably Professors Dumbledore, McGonagall and Snape. In the board game Cluedo, Professor Plum has been depicted as an absent-minded academic. Christopher Lloyd played Plum's film counterpart, a psychologist who had an affair with one of his patients.

Since the 1980s and 1990s, various stereotypes were re-evaluated, including professors. Writers began to depict professors as just normal human beings and might be quite well-rounded in abilities, excelling both in intelligence and in physical skills. An example of a fictional professor not depicted as shy or absent-minded is Indiana Jones, a professor as well as an archeologist-adventurer, who is skilled at both scholarship and fighting. The popularity of the Indiana Jones movie franchise had a significant impact on the previous stereotype, and created a new archetype which is both deeply knowledgeable and physically capable. The character generally referred to simply as the Professor on the television sitcom series, Gilligan's Island, although described alternatively as a high-school science teacher or research scientist, is depicted as a sensible advisor, a clever inventor, and a helpful friend to his fellow castaways. John Houseman's portrayal of law school professor Charles W. Kingsfield, Jr., in The Paper Chase (1973) remains the epitome of the strict, authoritarian professor who demands perfection from students. Annalise Keating (played by Viola Davis) from the American Broadcasting Company (ABC) legal drama mystery television series How to Get Away with Murder is a law professor at the fictional Middleton University. Early in the series, Annalise is a self-sufficient and confident woman, respected for being a great law professor and a great lawyer, feared and admired by her students, whose image breaks down as the series progresses. Sandra Oh stars as an English professor, Ji-Yoon Kim, recently promoted to the role of department chair in the 2021 Netflix series The Chair. The series includes her character's negotiation of liberal arts campus politics, in particular issues of racism, sexism, and social mores.

Mysterious, older men with magical powers (and unclear academic standing) are sometimes given the title of "Professor" in literature and theater. Notable examples include Professor X in the X-Men franchise, Professor Marvel in The Wizard of Oz and Professor Drosselmeyer (as he is sometimes known) from the ballet The Nutcracker. Also, the magician played by Christian Bale in the film The Prestige adopts 'The Professor' as his stage name. A variation of this type of non-academic professor is the "crackpot inventor", as portrayed by Professor Potts in the film version of Chitty Chitty Bang Bang or the Jerry Lewis-inspired Professor Frink character on The Simpsons. Other professors of this type are the thoughtful and kind Professor Digory Kirke of C. S. Lewis's Chronicles of Narnia.

== Non-academic usage ==
The title has been used by comedians, such as "Professor" Irwin Corey and Soupy Sales in his role as "The Big Professor". In the past, pianists in saloons and other rough environments have been called "professor". The puppeteer of a Punch and Judy show is also traditionally known as "Professor".

== See also ==
- Academic discipline
- Adjunct professor
- Sacrae Theologiae Professor (S.T.P.) – degree now awarded as S.T.D. or Doctor of Divinity (D.D.)
- Emeritus
- Habilitation
- Scholarly method
