= Research associate =

Profession

Research associates are researchers (scholars and professionals) that usually have an advanced degree beyond a Bachelor's degree such as a master's degree or a PhD.

In some universities/research institutes, such as Harvard/Harvard Medical School/Harvard School of Public Health, the candidate holds the degree of Ph.D. or possess training equivalent to that required for the Ph.D. In addition, the candidate must have demonstrated exceptional fitness in independent research. This position allows the candidate to enlarge professional network, get more experience, get publications, fellowships, grants to establish independence as a Principal Investigator (PI) or start looking for a more secure permanent job. It can advance to senior research associate (higher pay with more responsibilities equivalent to a PI), research scientist, senior research scientist, principal research scientist, and later head of research or equivalent.

In contrast to a research assistant, a research associate often has a graduate degree, such as a master's (e.g. Master of Science) or in some cases Master of Engineering or a doctoral degree (e.g. Doctor of Philosophy, Doctor of Medicine or Doctor of Pharmacy). In some cases it can be synonymous with postdoctoral research.

Research associate roles

In academic and research institutions, as well as in some industries, a research associate is a common professional position. Typically, research associates work with other researchers, scientists, and faculty members on a variety of research projects. The duties of research associates can change depending on the organization and the particular field, but the following are some typical duties:

1. Working closely with principal investigators (PIs), research scientists, or professors, research associates plan, carry out, and manage research projects. They provide their knowledge when designing, carrying out, and analyzing experiments or studies.
2. Literature Review: To comprehend the state of the art and the context of the research field, they conduct in-depth literature reviews, which guide the formulation of research hypotheses and methodologies.
3. Laboratory and Fieldwork: Research associates may carry out laboratory experiments, fieldwork, or clinical trials, depending on the field. They make certain that procedures are accurately and securely followed.
4. Technical Competencies: Research associates frequently need specialized technical competencies related to their research area, such as competence in the use of laboratory instruments, software tools, data analysis software, programming languages, etc.
5. They record the procedures, approaches, findings, and outcomes of the research. For the purpose of keeping track of the study's progress and disseminating its findings to the scientific community, this documentation is essential.
6. Data collection and analysis: Research associates gather data using various techniques such as surveys, observations, experiments, and more. They are frequently in charge of organizing and processing data using statistical and analytical methods in order to reach meaningful conclusions.

== See also ==
- Research fellow
